

200001–200100 

|-bgcolor=#d6d6d6
| 200001 ||  || — || May 11, 2007 || Catalina || CSS || — || align=right | 7.5 km || 
|-id=002 bgcolor=#fefefe
| 200002 Hehe ||  ||  || May 6, 2007 || XuYi || PMO NEO || — || align=right | 1.3 km || 
|-id=003 bgcolor=#d6d6d6
| 200003 Aokeda ||  ||  || May 19, 2007 || XuYi || PMO NEO || — || align=right | 4.8 km || 
|-id=004 bgcolor=#fefefe
| 200004 ||  || — || May 23, 2007 || Reedy Creek || J. Broughton || — || align=right | 1.2 km || 
|-id=005 bgcolor=#E9E9E9
| 200005 ||  || — || May 16, 2007 || Siding Spring || SSS || — || align=right | 2.7 km || 
|-id=006 bgcolor=#E9E9E9
| 200006 || 2007 LG || — || June 6, 2007 || Eskridge || Farpoint Obs. || — || align=right | 2.2 km || 
|-id=007 bgcolor=#fefefe
| 200007 ||  || — || June 8, 2007 || Catalina || CSS || V || align=right | 1.0 km || 
|-id=008 bgcolor=#d6d6d6
| 200008 ||  || — || June 8, 2007 || Kitt Peak || Spacewatch || — || align=right | 4.7 km || 
|-id=009 bgcolor=#fefefe
| 200009 ||  || — || June 8, 2007 || Kitt Peak || Spacewatch || NYS || align=right data-sort-value="0.88" | 880 m || 
|-id=010 bgcolor=#E9E9E9
| 200010 ||  || — || June 8, 2007 || Catalina || CSS || — || align=right | 3.2 km || 
|-id=011 bgcolor=#d6d6d6
| 200011 ||  || — || June 8, 2007 || Catalina || CSS || — || align=right | 3.7 km || 
|-id=012 bgcolor=#E9E9E9
| 200012 ||  || — || June 9, 2007 || Kitt Peak || Spacewatch || NEM || align=right | 2.8 km || 
|-id=013 bgcolor=#d6d6d6
| 200013 ||  || — || June 15, 2007 || Kitt Peak || Spacewatch || — || align=right | 5.3 km || 
|-id=014 bgcolor=#E9E9E9
| 200014 ||  || — || June 16, 2007 || Kitt Peak || Spacewatch || — || align=right | 2.0 km || 
|-id=015 bgcolor=#d6d6d6
| 200015 ||  || — || June 17, 2007 || Kitt Peak || Spacewatch || — || align=right | 4.0 km || 
|-id=016 bgcolor=#d6d6d6
| 200016 ||  || — || June 21, 2007 || Mount Lemmon || Mount Lemmon Survey || — || align=right | 4.8 km || 
|-id=017 bgcolor=#d6d6d6
| 200017 ||  || — || June 21, 2007 || Mount Lemmon || Mount Lemmon Survey || KOR || align=right | 1.7 km || 
|-id=018 bgcolor=#E9E9E9
| 200018 ||  || — || June 21, 2007 || Anderson Mesa || LONEOS || — || align=right | 1.8 km || 
|-id=019 bgcolor=#d6d6d6
| 200019 ||  || — || June 23, 2007 || Kitt Peak || Spacewatch || TRP || align=right | 4.0 km || 
|-id=020 bgcolor=#d6d6d6
| 200020 Cadi Ayyad ||  ||  || July 14, 2007 || Dauban || C. Rinner || URS || align=right | 6.0 km || 
|-id=021 bgcolor=#d6d6d6
| 200021 ||  || — || July 15, 2007 || Siding Spring || SSS || — || align=right | 5.3 km || 
|-id=022 bgcolor=#C2FFFF
| 200022 ||  || — || July 22, 2007 || Lulin Observatory || LUSS || L4 || align=right | 17 km || 
|-id=023 bgcolor=#C2FFFF
| 200023 ||  || — || July 25, 2007 || OAM || OAM Obs. || L4 || align=right | 16 km || 
|-id=024 bgcolor=#C2FFFF
| 200024 ||  || — || July 25, 2007 || Dauban || Chante-Perdrix Obs. || L4ERY || align=right | 14 km || 
|-id=025 bgcolor=#d6d6d6
| 200025 Cloud Gate ||  ||  || July 25, 2007 || Lulin Observatory || C.-S. Lin, Q.-z. Ye || — || align=right | 4.8 km || 
|-id=026 bgcolor=#d6d6d6
| 200026 ||  || — || August 7, 2007 || Eskridge || Farpoint Obs. || — || align=right | 4.7 km || 
|-id=027 bgcolor=#C2FFFF
| 200027 ||  || — || August 14, 2007 || Pla D'Arguines || R. Ferrando || L4 || align=right | 12 km || 
|-id=028 bgcolor=#C2FFFF
| 200028 ||  || — || August 12, 2007 || Socorro || LINEAR || L4 || align=right | 17 km || 
|-id=029 bgcolor=#C2FFFF
| 200029 ||  || — || August 13, 2007 || Socorro || LINEAR || L4 || align=right | 21 km || 
|-id=030 bgcolor=#d6d6d6
| 200030 ||  || — || August 13, 2007 || Anderson Mesa || LONEOS || — || align=right | 5.0 km || 
|-id=031 bgcolor=#d6d6d6
| 200031 Romainmontaigut ||  ||  || August 12, 2007 || Eygalayes Obs. || P. Sogorb || EOS || align=right | 3.3 km || 
|-id=032 bgcolor=#C2FFFF
| 200032 ||  || — || August 12, 2007 || Socorro || LINEAR || L4ERYslow? || align=right | 18 km || 
|-id=033 bgcolor=#d6d6d6
| 200033 Newtaipei ||  ||  || August 6, 2007 || Lulin Observatory || C.-S. Lin, Q.-z. Ye || — || align=right | 6.0 km || 
|-id=034 bgcolor=#d6d6d6
| 200034 ||  || — || September 5, 2007 || Mount Lemmon || Mount Lemmon Survey || ALA || align=right | 4.3 km || 
|-id=035 bgcolor=#C2FFFF
| 200035 ||  || — || September 10, 2007 || Kitt Peak || Spacewatch || L4 || align=right | 13 km || 
|-id=036 bgcolor=#C2FFFF
| 200036 ||  || — || September 10, 2007 || Mount Lemmon || Mount Lemmon Survey || L4 || align=right | 12 km || 
|-id=037 bgcolor=#C2FFFF
| 200037 ||  || — || September 11, 2007 || Catalina || CSS || L4 || align=right | 12 km || 
|-id=038 bgcolor=#d6d6d6
| 200038 ||  || — || September 12, 2007 || Mount Lemmon || Mount Lemmon Survey || KOR || align=right | 1.8 km || 
|-id=039 bgcolor=#d6d6d6
| 200039 ||  || — || September 11, 2007 || Mount Lemmon || Mount Lemmon Survey || 7:4 || align=right | 5.1 km || 
|-id=040 bgcolor=#d6d6d6
| 200040 ||  || — || September 10, 2007 || Kitt Peak || Spacewatch || 3:2 || align=right | 7.6 km || 
|-id=041 bgcolor=#E9E9E9
| 200041 ||  || — || September 13, 2007 || Anderson Mesa || LONEOS || — || align=right | 3.1 km || 
|-id=042 bgcolor=#C2FFFF
| 200042 ||  || — || October 6, 2007 || Kitt Peak || Spacewatch || L4 || align=right | 11 km || 
|-id=043 bgcolor=#d6d6d6
| 200043 ||  || — || October 13, 2007 || RAS || A. Lowe || 3:2 || align=right | 6.5 km || 
|-id=044 bgcolor=#E9E9E9
| 200044 ||  || — || October 13, 2007 || Mount Lemmon || Mount Lemmon Survey || — || align=right | 3.3 km || 
|-id=045 bgcolor=#E9E9E9
| 200045 ||  || — || October 11, 2007 || Kitt Peak || Spacewatch || MRX || align=right | 1.9 km || 
|-id=046 bgcolor=#C2FFFF
| 200046 ||  || — || October 13, 2007 || Catalina || CSS || L4 || align=right | 17 km || 
|-id=047 bgcolor=#d6d6d6
| 200047 ||  || — || October 17, 2007 || Mount Lemmon || Mount Lemmon Survey || HYG || align=right | 6.3 km || 
|-id=048 bgcolor=#fefefe
| 200048 ||  || — || June 30, 2008 || Kitt Peak || Spacewatch || — || align=right data-sort-value="0.98" | 980 m || 
|-id=049 bgcolor=#fefefe
| 200049 ||  || — || July 8, 2008 || OAM || OAM Obs. || NYS || align=right data-sort-value="0.98" | 980 m || 
|-id=050 bgcolor=#fefefe
| 200050 || 2008 OL || — || July 25, 2008 || Siding Spring || SSS || — || align=right | 2.1 km || 
|-id=051 bgcolor=#C2FFFF
| 200051 ||  || — || July 28, 2008 || Dauban || Chante-Perdrix Obs. || L4 || align=right | 15 km || 
|-id=052 bgcolor=#fefefe
| 200052 Sinigaglia ||  ||  || July 31, 2008 || Skylive Obs. || F. Tozzi, G. Sostero || V || align=right | 1.1 km || 
|-id=053 bgcolor=#fefefe
| 200053 ||  || — || August 2, 2008 || Eygalayes Obs. || Eygalayes Obs. || — || align=right data-sort-value="0.88" | 880 m || 
|-id=054 bgcolor=#d6d6d6
| 200054 ||  || — || August 6, 2008 || OAM || OAM Obs. || THM || align=right | 3.8 km || 
|-id=055 bgcolor=#fefefe
| 200055 ||  || — || August 8, 2008 || OAM || OAM Obs. || — || align=right | 1.8 km || 
|-id=056 bgcolor=#d6d6d6
| 200056 ||  || — || August 10, 2008 || OAM || OAM Obs. || EOS || align=right | 2.1 km || 
|-id=057 bgcolor=#C2FFFF
| 200057 ||  || — || August 11, 2008 || Črni Vrh || Črni Vrh || L4 || align=right | 15 km || 
|-id=058 bgcolor=#E9E9E9
| 200058 ||  || — || August 24, 2008 || Vicques || M. Ory || HOF || align=right | 4.5 km || 
|-id=059 bgcolor=#E9E9E9
| 200059 ||  || — || August 25, 2008 || OAM || OAM Obs. || — || align=right | 2.4 km || 
|-id=060 bgcolor=#fefefe
| 200060 ||  || — || August 25, 2008 || OAM || OAM Obs. || NYS || align=right data-sort-value="0.90" | 900 m || 
|-id=061 bgcolor=#d6d6d6
| 200061 ||  || — || August 25, 2008 || OAM || OAM Obs. || EOS || align=right | 4.4 km || 
|-id=062 bgcolor=#fefefe
| 200062 ||  || — || August 26, 2008 || OAM || OAM Obs. || NYS || align=right data-sort-value="0.78" | 780 m || 
|-id=063 bgcolor=#fefefe
| 200063 ||  || — || August 24, 2008 || OAM || OAM Obs. || — || align=right data-sort-value="0.91" | 910 m || 
|-id=064 bgcolor=#d6d6d6
| 200064 ||  || — || September 3, 2008 || Kitt Peak || Spacewatch || — || align=right | 3.2 km || 
|-id=065 bgcolor=#d6d6d6
| 200065 || 2805 P-L || — || September 24, 1960 || Palomar || PLS || EOS || align=right | 2.6 km || 
|-id=066 bgcolor=#E9E9E9
| 200066 || 2836 P-L || — || September 24, 1960 || Palomar || PLS || — || align=right | 1.9 km || 
|-id=067 bgcolor=#fefefe
| 200067 || 4133 P-L || — || September 24, 1960 || Palomar || PLS || V || align=right | 1.1 km || 
|-id=068 bgcolor=#d6d6d6
| 200068 || 4310 P-L || — || September 24, 1960 || Palomar || PLS || EMA || align=right | 5.6 km || 
|-id=069 bgcolor=#C2FFFF
| 200069 Alastor || 4322 P-L ||  || September 24, 1960 || Palomar || PLS || L4 || align=right | 12 km || 
|-id=070 bgcolor=#E9E9E9
| 200070 || 2090 T-1 || — || March 25, 1971 || Palomar || PLS || — || align=right | 2.2 km || 
|-id=071 bgcolor=#E9E9E9
| 200071 || 2051 T-2 || — || September 29, 1973 || Palomar || PLS || — || align=right | 2.0 km || 
|-id=072 bgcolor=#d6d6d6
| 200072 || 2132 T-2 || — || September 29, 1973 || Palomar || PLS || NAE || align=right | 5.7 km || 
|-id=073 bgcolor=#FA8072
| 200073 || 2190 T-2 || — || September 29, 1973 || Palomar || PLS || — || align=right | 1.3 km || 
|-id=074 bgcolor=#E9E9E9
| 200074 || 2194 T-2 || — || September 29, 1973 || Palomar || PLS || — || align=right | 2.3 km || 
|-id=075 bgcolor=#fefefe
| 200075 || 3119 T-2 || — || September 30, 1973 || Palomar || PLS || — || align=right | 1.5 km || 
|-id=076 bgcolor=#E9E9E9
| 200076 || 5009 T-2 || — || September 25, 1973 || Palomar || PLS || EUN || align=right | 1.8 km || 
|-id=077 bgcolor=#E9E9E9
| 200077 || 5134 T-2 || — || September 25, 1973 || Palomar || PLS || — || align=right | 2.7 km || 
|-id=078 bgcolor=#d6d6d6
| 200078 || 1028 T-3 || — || October 17, 1977 || Palomar || PLS || — || align=right | 4.9 km || 
|-id=079 bgcolor=#E9E9E9
| 200079 || 1138 T-3 || — || October 17, 1977 || Palomar || PLS || — || align=right | 4.6 km || 
|-id=080 bgcolor=#fefefe
| 200080 || 2436 T-3 || — || October 16, 1977 || Palomar || PLS || — || align=right | 1.4 km || 
|-id=081 bgcolor=#E9E9E9
| 200081 || 2674 T-3 || — || October 11, 1977 || Palomar || PLS || NEM || align=right | 3.3 km || 
|-id=082 bgcolor=#d6d6d6
| 200082 || 4022 T-3 || — || October 16, 1977 || Palomar || PLS || — || align=right | 5.5 km || 
|-id=083 bgcolor=#d6d6d6
| 200083 || 5037 T-3 || — || October 16, 1977 || Palomar || PLS || — || align=right | 4.4 km || 
|-id=084 bgcolor=#fefefe
| 200084 ||  || — || March 1, 1981 || Siding Spring || S. J. Bus || ERI || align=right | 2.1 km || 
|-id=085 bgcolor=#E9E9E9
| 200085 ||  || — || September 14, 1991 || Palomar || H. E. Holt || — || align=right | 1.3 km || 
|-id=086 bgcolor=#d6d6d6
| 200086 ||  || — || August 25, 1992 || Palomar || A. Lowe || — || align=right | 4.4 km || 
|-id=087 bgcolor=#fefefe
| 200087 ||  || — || September 24, 1992 || Kitt Peak || Spacewatch || NYS || align=right | 1.3 km || 
|-id=088 bgcolor=#E9E9E9
| 200088 ||  || — || January 26, 1993 || Kitt Peak || Spacewatch || — || align=right | 3.5 km || 
|-id=089 bgcolor=#E9E9E9
| 200089 ||  || — || March 17, 1993 || La Silla || UESAC || — || align=right | 1.9 km || 
|-id=090 bgcolor=#E9E9E9
| 200090 ||  || — || October 11, 1993 || La Silla || E. W. Elst || AGN || align=right | 2.0 km || 
|-id=091 bgcolor=#fefefe
| 200091 ||  || — || January 8, 1994 || Kitt Peak || Spacewatch || V || align=right | 1.3 km || 
|-id=092 bgcolor=#fefefe
| 200092 ||  || — || May 4, 1994 || Kitt Peak || Spacewatch || — || align=right | 1.7 km || 
|-id=093 bgcolor=#fefefe
| 200093 ||  || — || September 5, 1994 || La Silla || E. W. Elst || — || align=right | 1.0 km || 
|-id=094 bgcolor=#E9E9E9
| 200094 ||  || — || September 29, 1994 || Kitt Peak || Spacewatch || HOF || align=right | 3.3 km || 
|-id=095 bgcolor=#fefefe
| 200095 ||  || — || September 29, 1994 || Kitt Peak || Spacewatch || — || align=right data-sort-value="0.99" | 990 m || 
|-id=096 bgcolor=#E9E9E9
| 200096 ||  || — || October 6, 1994 || Kitt Peak || Spacewatch || HOF || align=right | 3.5 km || 
|-id=097 bgcolor=#E9E9E9
| 200097 ||  || — || October 28, 1994 || Kitt Peak || Spacewatch || NEM || align=right | 3.1 km || 
|-id=098 bgcolor=#fefefe
| 200098 ||  || — || January 23, 1995 || Kitt Peak || Spacewatch || MAS || align=right data-sort-value="0.81" | 810 m || 
|-id=099 bgcolor=#d6d6d6
| 200099 ||  || — || February 25, 1995 || Kitt Peak || Spacewatch || — || align=right | 4.0 km || 
|-id=100 bgcolor=#d6d6d6
| 200100 ||  || — || April 26, 1995 || Kitt Peak || Spacewatch || LIX || align=right | 7.6 km || 
|}

200101–200200 

|-bgcolor=#d6d6d6
| 200101 ||  || — || June 25, 1995 || Kitt Peak || Spacewatch || VER || align=right | 4.9 km || 
|-id=102 bgcolor=#E9E9E9
| 200102 ||  || — || August 31, 1995 || Haleakala || AMOS || — || align=right | 1.7 km || 
|-id=103 bgcolor=#E9E9E9
| 200103 ||  || — || August 28, 1995 || Kitt Peak || Spacewatch || — || align=right | 2.1 km || 
|-id=104 bgcolor=#E9E9E9
| 200104 || 1995 SD || — || September 16, 1995 || Kleť || M. Tichý || — || align=right | 1.7 km || 
|-id=105 bgcolor=#E9E9E9
| 200105 ||  || — || September 19, 1995 || Kitt Peak || Spacewatch || — || align=right | 1.5 km || 
|-id=106 bgcolor=#E9E9E9
| 200106 ||  || — || September 18, 1995 || Kitt Peak || Spacewatch || — || align=right | 1.5 km || 
|-id=107 bgcolor=#E9E9E9
| 200107 ||  || — || September 30, 1995 || Kitt Peak || Spacewatch || — || align=right | 2.1 km || 
|-id=108 bgcolor=#E9E9E9
| 200108 ||  || — || October 22, 1995 || Kitt Peak || Spacewatch || — || align=right | 1.3 km || 
|-id=109 bgcolor=#E9E9E9
| 200109 ||  || — || October 24, 1995 || Kitt Peak || Spacewatch || — || align=right | 1.7 km || 
|-id=110 bgcolor=#E9E9E9
| 200110 ||  || — || October 17, 1995 || Kitt Peak || Spacewatch || — || align=right | 1.6 km || 
|-id=111 bgcolor=#fefefe
| 200111 ||  || — || October 25, 1995 || Kitt Peak || Spacewatch || — || align=right data-sort-value="0.82" | 820 m || 
|-id=112 bgcolor=#E9E9E9
| 200112 ||  || — || October 17, 1995 || Kitt Peak || Spacewatch || — || align=right | 1.4 km || 
|-id=113 bgcolor=#fefefe
| 200113 ||  || — || October 19, 1995 || Kitt Peak || Spacewatch || — || align=right data-sort-value="0.85" | 850 m || 
|-id=114 bgcolor=#E9E9E9
| 200114 ||  || — || November 15, 1995 || Kitt Peak || Spacewatch || — || align=right | 2.6 km || 
|-id=115 bgcolor=#E9E9E9
| 200115 ||  || — || November 16, 1995 || Kitt Peak || Spacewatch || — || align=right | 1.4 km || 
|-id=116 bgcolor=#E9E9E9
| 200116 ||  || — || January 12, 1996 || Kitt Peak || Spacewatch || HEN || align=right | 3.3 km || 
|-id=117 bgcolor=#E9E9E9
| 200117 ||  || — || January 12, 1996 || Kitt Peak || Spacewatch || AGN || align=right | 1.6 km || 
|-id=118 bgcolor=#fefefe
| 200118 ||  || — || January 15, 1996 || Kitt Peak || Spacewatch || V || align=right | 1.0 km || 
|-id=119 bgcolor=#fefefe
| 200119 ||  || — || January 16, 1996 || Kitt Peak || Spacewatch || — || align=right | 1.7 km || 
|-id=120 bgcolor=#d6d6d6
| 200120 ||  || — || April 11, 1996 || Kitt Peak || Spacewatch || — || align=right | 3.0 km || 
|-id=121 bgcolor=#d6d6d6
| 200121 ||  || — || October 4, 1996 || Kitt Peak || Spacewatch || TIR || align=right | 4.8 km || 
|-id=122 bgcolor=#E9E9E9
| 200122 ||  || — || February 4, 1997 || Haleakala || NEAT || BRU || align=right | 5.4 km || 
|-id=123 bgcolor=#E9E9E9
| 200123 ||  || — || March 14, 1997 || Kitt Peak || Spacewatch || WIT || align=right | 1.5 km || 
|-id=124 bgcolor=#E9E9E9
| 200124 ||  || — || April 7, 1997 || Kitt Peak || Spacewatch || DOR || align=right | 4.5 km || 
|-id=125 bgcolor=#fefefe
| 200125 || 1997 HU || — || April 28, 1997 || Kitt Peak || Spacewatch || — || align=right | 1.9 km || 
|-id=126 bgcolor=#fefefe
| 200126 ||  || — || April 30, 1997 || Socorro || LINEAR || — || align=right | 2.7 km || 
|-id=127 bgcolor=#d6d6d6
| 200127 || 1997 MO || — || June 27, 1997 || Kitt Peak || Spacewatch || — || align=right | 3.5 km || 
|-id=128 bgcolor=#fefefe
| 200128 ||  || — || September 29, 1997 || Kitt Peak || Spacewatch || — || align=right | 1.0 km || 
|-id=129 bgcolor=#d6d6d6
| 200129 ||  || — || September 27, 1997 || Mallorca || Á. López J., R. Pacheco || — || align=right | 5.1 km || 
|-id=130 bgcolor=#fefefe
| 200130 ||  || — || October 2, 1997 || Kitt Peak || Spacewatch || MAS || align=right data-sort-value="0.68" | 680 m || 
|-id=131 bgcolor=#fefefe
| 200131 ||  || — || October 23, 1997 || Kitt Peak || Spacewatch || V || align=right data-sort-value="0.75" | 750 m || 
|-id=132 bgcolor=#fefefe
| 200132 ||  || — || November 22, 1997 || Kitt Peak || Spacewatch || — || align=right | 1.3 km || 
|-id=133 bgcolor=#d6d6d6
| 200133 ||  || — || November 23, 1997 || Kitt Peak || Spacewatch || — || align=right | 6.0 km || 
|-id=134 bgcolor=#d6d6d6
| 200134 ||  || — || November 22, 1997 || Kitt Peak || Spacewatch || — || align=right | 5.2 km || 
|-id=135 bgcolor=#fefefe
| 200135 ||  || — || November 22, 1997 || Kitt Peak || Spacewatch || — || align=right | 1.0 km || 
|-id=136 bgcolor=#d6d6d6
| 200136 ||  || — || November 23, 1997 || Kitt Peak || Spacewatch || — || align=right | 5.8 km || 
|-id=137 bgcolor=#d6d6d6
| 200137 ||  || — || November 23, 1997 || Kitt Peak || Spacewatch || — || align=right | 5.0 km || 
|-id=138 bgcolor=#fefefe
| 200138 ||  || — || November 23, 1997 || Kitt Peak || Spacewatch || MAS || align=right | 1.0 km || 
|-id=139 bgcolor=#d6d6d6
| 200139 ||  || — || November 23, 1997 || Kitt Peak || Spacewatch || — || align=right | 4.2 km || 
|-id=140 bgcolor=#d6d6d6
| 200140 ||  || — || November 28, 1997 || Xinglong || SCAP || — || align=right | 5.8 km || 
|-id=141 bgcolor=#fefefe
| 200141 ||  || — || December 3, 1997 || Chichibu || N. Satō || — || align=right | 1.6 km || 
|-id=142 bgcolor=#fefefe
| 200142 ||  || — || January 23, 1998 || Caussols || ODAS || — || align=right | 1.4 km || 
|-id=143 bgcolor=#fefefe
| 200143 ||  || — || February 23, 1998 || Kitt Peak || Spacewatch || — || align=right | 1.5 km || 
|-id=144 bgcolor=#E9E9E9
| 200144 ||  || — || February 22, 1998 || Kitt Peak || Spacewatch || — || align=right | 1.1 km || 
|-id=145 bgcolor=#fefefe
| 200145 ||  || — || February 28, 1998 || La Silla || C.-I. Lagerkvist || — || align=right | 1.5 km || 
|-id=146 bgcolor=#E9E9E9
| 200146 ||  || — || March 28, 1998 || Socorro || LINEAR || — || align=right | 2.5 km || 
|-id=147 bgcolor=#fefefe
| 200147 ||  || — || April 27, 1998 || Kitt Peak || Spacewatch || NYS || align=right | 1.1 km || 
|-id=148 bgcolor=#E9E9E9
| 200148 ||  || — || April 21, 1998 || Socorro || LINEAR || — || align=right | 1.4 km || 
|-id=149 bgcolor=#E9E9E9
| 200149 ||  || — || April 23, 1998 || Socorro || LINEAR || MAR || align=right | 2.2 km || 
|-id=150 bgcolor=#fefefe
| 200150 ||  || — || June 1, 1998 || La Silla || E. W. Elst || — || align=right | 2.1 km || 
|-id=151 bgcolor=#E9E9E9
| 200151 ||  || — || August 26, 1998 || Kitt Peak || Spacewatch || — || align=right | 2.3 km || 
|-id=152 bgcolor=#E9E9E9
| 200152 ||  || — || August 24, 1998 || Socorro || LINEAR || — || align=right | 5.1 km || 
|-id=153 bgcolor=#E9E9E9
| 200153 ||  || — || August 24, 1998 || Socorro || LINEAR || — || align=right | 4.7 km || 
|-id=154 bgcolor=#fefefe
| 200154 || 1998 RJ || — || September 1, 1998 || Woomera || F. B. Zoltowski || FLO || align=right data-sort-value="0.97" | 970 m || 
|-id=155 bgcolor=#E9E9E9
| 200155 ||  || — || September 14, 1998 || Socorro || LINEAR || — || align=right | 3.4 km || 
|-id=156 bgcolor=#E9E9E9
| 200156 ||  || — || September 18, 1998 || Goodricke-Pigott || R. A. Tucker || — || align=right | 5.2 km || 
|-id=157 bgcolor=#fefefe
| 200157 ||  || — || September 24, 1998 || Kitt Peak || Spacewatch || — || align=right data-sort-value="0.93" | 930 m || 
|-id=158 bgcolor=#d6d6d6
| 200158 ||  || — || October 15, 1998 || Catalina || CSS || — || align=right | 5.8 km || 
|-id=159 bgcolor=#fefefe
| 200159 ||  || — || December 14, 1998 || Socorro || LINEAR || PHO || align=right | 1.8 km || 
|-id=160 bgcolor=#fefefe
| 200160 ||  || — || December 25, 1998 || Kitt Peak || Spacewatch || — || align=right data-sort-value="0.70" | 700 m || 
|-id=161 bgcolor=#fefefe
| 200161 ||  || — || January 9, 1999 || Kitt Peak || Spacewatch || FLO || align=right data-sort-value="0.91" | 910 m || 
|-id=162 bgcolor=#d6d6d6
| 200162 ||  || — || January 24, 1999 || Višnjan Observatory || K. Korlević || — || align=right | 6.7 km || 
|-id=163 bgcolor=#fefefe
| 200163 ||  || — || February 10, 1999 || Socorro || LINEAR || PHO || align=right | 1.6 km || 
|-id=164 bgcolor=#fefefe
| 200164 ||  || — || February 12, 1999 || Socorro || LINEAR || — || align=right data-sort-value="0.91" | 910 m || 
|-id=165 bgcolor=#d6d6d6
| 200165 ||  || — || February 8, 1999 || Mauna Kea || C. Veillet || THM || align=right | 2.4 km || 
|-id=166 bgcolor=#d6d6d6
| 200166 ||  || — || February 8, 1999 || Kitt Peak || Spacewatch || EOS || align=right | 5.0 km || 
|-id=167 bgcolor=#fefefe
| 200167 ||  || — || February 12, 1999 || Kitt Peak || Spacewatch || FLO || align=right data-sort-value="0.82" | 820 m || 
|-id=168 bgcolor=#d6d6d6
| 200168 || 1999 DG || — || February 16, 1999 || Caussols || ODAS || — || align=right | 4.9 km || 
|-id=169 bgcolor=#fefefe
| 200169 ||  || — || March 19, 1999 || Socorro || LINEAR || — || align=right | 2.2 km || 
|-id=170 bgcolor=#d6d6d6
| 200170 ||  || — || March 20, 1999 || Socorro || LINEAR || — || align=right | 4.4 km || 
|-id=171 bgcolor=#fefefe
| 200171 ||  || — || March 22, 1999 || Anderson Mesa || LONEOS || — || align=right | 1.4 km || 
|-id=172 bgcolor=#fefefe
| 200172 ||  || — || March 20, 1999 || Apache Point || SDSS || NYS || align=right data-sort-value="0.95" | 950 m || 
|-id=173 bgcolor=#d6d6d6
| 200173 ||  || — || April 14, 1999 || Kitt Peak || Spacewatch || THM || align=right | 2.9 km || 
|-id=174 bgcolor=#fefefe
| 200174 ||  || — || May 14, 1999 || Catalina || CSS || — || align=right | 2.6 km || 
|-id=175 bgcolor=#FA8072
| 200175 ||  || — || May 13, 1999 || Socorro || LINEAR || PHO || align=right | 1.7 km || 
|-id=176 bgcolor=#fefefe
| 200176 ||  || — || May 10, 1999 || Socorro || LINEAR || — || align=right | 1.2 km || 
|-id=177 bgcolor=#fefefe
| 200177 ||  || — || May 10, 1999 || Socorro || LINEAR || NYS || align=right | 1.2 km || 
|-id=178 bgcolor=#fefefe
| 200178 ||  || — || May 12, 1999 || Socorro || LINEAR || — || align=right | 1.8 km || 
|-id=179 bgcolor=#fefefe
| 200179 ||  || — || May 13, 1999 || Socorro || LINEAR || — || align=right | 1.6 km || 
|-id=180 bgcolor=#fefefe
| 200180 ||  || — || May 13, 1999 || Socorro || LINEAR || — || align=right | 3.7 km || 
|-id=181 bgcolor=#fefefe
| 200181 ||  || — || May 19, 1999 || Kitt Peak || Spacewatch || MAS || align=right data-sort-value="0.99" | 990 m || 
|-id=182 bgcolor=#FA8072
| 200182 ||  || — || July 22, 1999 || Socorro || LINEAR || — || align=right data-sort-value="0.62" | 620 m || 
|-id=183 bgcolor=#E9E9E9
| 200183 || 1999 RO || — || September 3, 1999 || Ondřejov || L. Kotková || — || align=right | 2.7 km || 
|-id=184 bgcolor=#d6d6d6
| 200184 ||  || — || September 4, 1999 || Kitt Peak || Spacewatch || — || align=right | 5.6 km || 
|-id=185 bgcolor=#E9E9E9
| 200185 ||  || — || September 7, 1999 || Socorro || LINEAR || EUN || align=right | 1.9 km || 
|-id=186 bgcolor=#E9E9E9
| 200186 ||  || — || September 7, 1999 || Socorro || LINEAR || — || align=right | 1.3 km || 
|-id=187 bgcolor=#E9E9E9
| 200187 ||  || — || September 7, 1999 || Socorro || LINEAR || — || align=right | 2.5 km || 
|-id=188 bgcolor=#E9E9E9
| 200188 ||  || — || September 7, 1999 || Socorro || LINEAR || — || align=right | 2.7 km || 
|-id=189 bgcolor=#E9E9E9
| 200189 ||  || — || September 8, 1999 || Socorro || LINEAR || — || align=right | 2.5 km || 
|-id=190 bgcolor=#E9E9E9
| 200190 ||  || — || September 8, 1999 || Socorro || LINEAR || — || align=right | 3.3 km || 
|-id=191 bgcolor=#E9E9E9
| 200191 ||  || — || September 8, 1999 || Socorro || LINEAR || — || align=right | 4.6 km || 
|-id=192 bgcolor=#E9E9E9
| 200192 ||  || — || September 9, 1999 || Socorro || LINEAR || — || align=right | 2.8 km || 
|-id=193 bgcolor=#E9E9E9
| 200193 ||  || — || September 9, 1999 || Socorro || LINEAR || — || align=right | 3.2 km || 
|-id=194 bgcolor=#E9E9E9
| 200194 ||  || — || September 9, 1999 || Socorro || LINEAR || — || align=right | 3.6 km || 
|-id=195 bgcolor=#fefefe
| 200195 ||  || — || September 14, 1999 || Kitt Peak || Spacewatch || NYS || align=right | 1.1 km || 
|-id=196 bgcolor=#E9E9E9
| 200196 ||  || — || September 14, 1999 || Kitt Peak || Spacewatch || — || align=right | 2.7 km || 
|-id=197 bgcolor=#E9E9E9
| 200197 ||  || — || September 8, 1999 || Socorro || LINEAR || EUN || align=right | 2.1 km || 
|-id=198 bgcolor=#E9E9E9
| 200198 ||  || — || September 2, 1999 || Kitt Peak || B. Gladman || — || align=right | 2.2 km || 
|-id=199 bgcolor=#E9E9E9
| 200199 ||  || — || September 5, 1999 || Catalina || CSS || — || align=right | 2.2 km || 
|-id=200 bgcolor=#E9E9E9
| 200200 ||  || — || September 8, 1999 || Catalina || CSS || — || align=right | 1.4 km || 
|}

200201–200300 

|-bgcolor=#E9E9E9
| 200201 ||  || — || September 5, 1999 || Kitt Peak || Spacewatch || — || align=right | 1.8 km || 
|-id=202 bgcolor=#E9E9E9
| 200202 ||  || — || September 7, 1999 || Catalina || CSS || — || align=right | 5.3 km || 
|-id=203 bgcolor=#E9E9E9
| 200203 ||  || — || September 30, 1999 || Catalina || CSS || — || align=right | 2.2 km || 
|-id=204 bgcolor=#E9E9E9
| 200204 ||  || — || October 2, 1999 || Kleť || Kleť Obs. || — || align=right | 2.3 km || 
|-id=205 bgcolor=#E9E9E9
| 200205 ||  || — || October 3, 1999 || Socorro || LINEAR || — || align=right | 4.4 km || 
|-id=206 bgcolor=#E9E9E9
| 200206 ||  || — || October 7, 1999 || Kitt Peak || Spacewatch || — || align=right | 2.1 km || 
|-id=207 bgcolor=#E9E9E9
| 200207 ||  || — || October 15, 1999 || Kitt Peak || Spacewatch || — || align=right | 1.2 km || 
|-id=208 bgcolor=#E9E9E9
| 200208 ||  || — || October 2, 1999 || Socorro || LINEAR || JUN || align=right | 1.8 km || 
|-id=209 bgcolor=#E9E9E9
| 200209 ||  || — || October 4, 1999 || Socorro || LINEAR || EUN || align=right | 2.3 km || 
|-id=210 bgcolor=#E9E9E9
| 200210 ||  || — || October 4, 1999 || Socorro || LINEAR || — || align=right | 1.6 km || 
|-id=211 bgcolor=#fefefe
| 200211 ||  || — || October 7, 1999 || Socorro || LINEAR || H || align=right | 1.2 km || 
|-id=212 bgcolor=#E9E9E9
| 200212 ||  || — || October 7, 1999 || Socorro || LINEAR || — || align=right | 2.3 km || 
|-id=213 bgcolor=#E9E9E9
| 200213 ||  || — || October 10, 1999 || Socorro || LINEAR || — || align=right | 3.4 km || 
|-id=214 bgcolor=#E9E9E9
| 200214 ||  || — || October 10, 1999 || Socorro || LINEAR || — || align=right | 3.4 km || 
|-id=215 bgcolor=#E9E9E9
| 200215 ||  || — || October 10, 1999 || Socorro || LINEAR || — || align=right | 3.6 km || 
|-id=216 bgcolor=#E9E9E9
| 200216 ||  || — || October 12, 1999 || Socorro || LINEAR || INO || align=right | 1.2 km || 
|-id=217 bgcolor=#E9E9E9
| 200217 ||  || — || October 12, 1999 || Socorro || LINEAR || — || align=right | 2.2 km || 
|-id=218 bgcolor=#E9E9E9
| 200218 ||  || — || October 15, 1999 || Socorro || LINEAR || — || align=right | 3.5 km || 
|-id=219 bgcolor=#E9E9E9
| 200219 ||  || — || October 1, 1999 || Catalina || CSS || — || align=right | 2.4 km || 
|-id=220 bgcolor=#E9E9E9
| 200220 ||  || — || October 2, 1999 || Kitt Peak || Spacewatch || — || align=right | 1.2 km || 
|-id=221 bgcolor=#E9E9E9
| 200221 ||  || — || October 4, 1999 || Kitt Peak || Spacewatch || — || align=right | 3.2 km || 
|-id=222 bgcolor=#E9E9E9
| 200222 ||  || — || October 3, 1999 || Socorro || LINEAR || ADE || align=right | 5.1 km || 
|-id=223 bgcolor=#E9E9E9
| 200223 ||  || — || October 3, 1999 || Socorro || LINEAR || ADE || align=right | 5.5 km || 
|-id=224 bgcolor=#E9E9E9
| 200224 ||  || — || October 6, 1999 || Socorro || LINEAR || — || align=right | 2.3 km || 
|-id=225 bgcolor=#E9E9E9
| 200225 ||  || — || October 10, 1999 || Socorro || LINEAR || — || align=right | 4.0 km || 
|-id=226 bgcolor=#E9E9E9
| 200226 ||  || — || October 30, 1999 || Kitt Peak || Spacewatch || — || align=right | 2.6 km || 
|-id=227 bgcolor=#E9E9E9
| 200227 ||  || — || October 31, 1999 || Kitt Peak || Spacewatch || — || align=right | 2.4 km || 
|-id=228 bgcolor=#E9E9E9
| 200228 ||  || — || October 31, 1999 || Kitt Peak || Spacewatch || — || align=right | 2.0 km || 
|-id=229 bgcolor=#E9E9E9
| 200229 ||  || — || October 31, 1999 || Kitt Peak || Spacewatch || NEM || align=right | 3.6 km || 
|-id=230 bgcolor=#E9E9E9
| 200230 ||  || — || October 16, 1999 || Kitt Peak || Spacewatch || — || align=right | 1.8 km || 
|-id=231 bgcolor=#E9E9E9
| 200231 ||  || — || October 16, 1999 || Kitt Peak || Spacewatch || WIT || align=right | 1.5 km || 
|-id=232 bgcolor=#E9E9E9
| 200232 ||  || — || October 31, 1999 || Catalina || CSS || — || align=right | 4.5 km || 
|-id=233 bgcolor=#E9E9E9
| 200233 ||  || — || November 4, 1999 || Bergisch Gladbach || W. Bickel || — || align=right | 2.4 km || 
|-id=234 bgcolor=#E9E9E9
| 200234 Kumashiro ||  ||  || November 4, 1999 || Kuma Kogen || A. Nakamura || GEF || align=right | 1.7 km || 
|-id=235 bgcolor=#E9E9E9
| 200235 ||  || — || November 2, 1999 || Kitt Peak || Spacewatch || — || align=right | 2.2 km || 
|-id=236 bgcolor=#E9E9E9
| 200236 ||  || — || November 3, 1999 || Socorro || LINEAR || — || align=right | 2.7 km || 
|-id=237 bgcolor=#E9E9E9
| 200237 ||  || — || November 3, 1999 || Socorro || LINEAR || — || align=right | 2.1 km || 
|-id=238 bgcolor=#E9E9E9
| 200238 ||  || — || November 4, 1999 || Socorro || LINEAR || — || align=right | 4.0 km || 
|-id=239 bgcolor=#E9E9E9
| 200239 ||  || — || November 5, 1999 || Kitt Peak || Spacewatch || HEN || align=right | 1.3 km || 
|-id=240 bgcolor=#E9E9E9
| 200240 ||  || — || November 1, 1999 || Kitt Peak || Spacewatch || — || align=right | 2.7 km || 
|-id=241 bgcolor=#E9E9E9
| 200241 ||  || — || November 9, 1999 || Socorro || LINEAR || — || align=right | 3.4 km || 
|-id=242 bgcolor=#E9E9E9
| 200242 ||  || — || November 9, 1999 || Catalina || CSS || — || align=right | 3.0 km || 
|-id=243 bgcolor=#E9E9E9
| 200243 ||  || — || November 5, 1999 || Kitt Peak || Spacewatch || — || align=right | 2.8 km || 
|-id=244 bgcolor=#E9E9E9
| 200244 ||  || — || November 3, 1999 || Kitt Peak || Spacewatch || — || align=right | 3.0 km || 
|-id=245 bgcolor=#E9E9E9
| 200245 ||  || — || November 4, 1999 || Kitt Peak || Spacewatch || — || align=right | 1.7 km || 
|-id=246 bgcolor=#E9E9E9
| 200246 ||  || — || November 6, 1999 || Kitt Peak || Spacewatch || — || align=right | 1.9 km || 
|-id=247 bgcolor=#E9E9E9
| 200247 ||  || — || November 12, 1999 || Kitt Peak || Spacewatch || — || align=right | 4.1 km || 
|-id=248 bgcolor=#E9E9E9
| 200248 ||  || — || November 13, 1999 || Socorro || LINEAR || — || align=right | 4.6 km || 
|-id=249 bgcolor=#E9E9E9
| 200249 ||  || — || November 9, 1999 || Kitt Peak || Spacewatch || — || align=right | 4.1 km || 
|-id=250 bgcolor=#E9E9E9
| 200250 ||  || — || November 14, 1999 || Socorro || LINEAR || AGN || align=right | 1.2 km || 
|-id=251 bgcolor=#E9E9E9
| 200251 ||  || — || November 10, 1999 || Kitt Peak || Spacewatch || — || align=right | 3.0 km || 
|-id=252 bgcolor=#E9E9E9
| 200252 ||  || — || November 15, 1999 || Kitt Peak || Spacewatch || — || align=right | 1.7 km || 
|-id=253 bgcolor=#E9E9E9
| 200253 ||  || — || November 15, 1999 || Socorro || LINEAR || — || align=right | 3.8 km || 
|-id=254 bgcolor=#E9E9E9
| 200254 ||  || — || November 15, 1999 || Socorro || LINEAR || — || align=right | 4.5 km || 
|-id=255 bgcolor=#E9E9E9
| 200255 Weigle ||  ||  || November 10, 1999 || Kitt Peak || M. W. Buie || — || align=right | 1.5 km || 
|-id=256 bgcolor=#E9E9E9
| 200256 ||  || — || November 5, 1999 || Socorro || LINEAR || MRX || align=right | 1.7 km || 
|-id=257 bgcolor=#E9E9E9
| 200257 ||  || — || November 2, 1999 || Catalina || CSS || — || align=right | 3.9 km || 
|-id=258 bgcolor=#E9E9E9
| 200258 ||  || — || November 5, 1999 || Socorro || LINEAR || — || align=right | 3.3 km || 
|-id=259 bgcolor=#E9E9E9
| 200259 ||  || — || November 28, 1999 || Kitt Peak || Spacewatch || — || align=right | 2.7 km || 
|-id=260 bgcolor=#E9E9E9
| 200260 ||  || — || November 30, 1999 || Kitt Peak || Spacewatch || NEM || align=right | 3.0 km || 
|-id=261 bgcolor=#E9E9E9
| 200261 || 1999 XR || — || December 2, 1999 || Kitt Peak || Spacewatch || — || align=right | 4.0 km || 
|-id=262 bgcolor=#E9E9E9
| 200262 ||  || — || December 7, 1999 || Socorro || LINEAR || — || align=right | 4.2 km || 
|-id=263 bgcolor=#E9E9E9
| 200263 ||  || — || December 7, 1999 || Socorro || LINEAR || JUN || align=right | 1.9 km || 
|-id=264 bgcolor=#E9E9E9
| 200264 ||  || — || December 7, 1999 || Socorro || LINEAR || XIZ || align=right | 1.9 km || 
|-id=265 bgcolor=#E9E9E9
| 200265 ||  || — || December 7, 1999 || Socorro || LINEAR || — || align=right | 2.8 km || 
|-id=266 bgcolor=#E9E9E9
| 200266 ||  || — || December 7, 1999 || Socorro || LINEAR || MRX || align=right | 2.0 km || 
|-id=267 bgcolor=#E9E9E9
| 200267 ||  || — || December 4, 1999 || Catalina || CSS || — || align=right | 4.1 km || 
|-id=268 bgcolor=#E9E9E9
| 200268 ||  || — || December 4, 1999 || Catalina || CSS || MAR || align=right | 1.9 km || 
|-id=269 bgcolor=#E9E9E9
| 200269 ||  || — || December 5, 1999 || Catalina || CSS || — || align=right | 3.2 km || 
|-id=270 bgcolor=#E9E9E9
| 200270 ||  || — || December 5, 1999 || Catalina || CSS || — || align=right | 4.3 km || 
|-id=271 bgcolor=#E9E9E9
| 200271 ||  || — || December 7, 1999 || Catalina || CSS || — || align=right | 4.2 km || 
|-id=272 bgcolor=#E9E9E9
| 200272 ||  || — || December 7, 1999 || Catalina || CSS || JUN || align=right | 2.3 km || 
|-id=273 bgcolor=#E9E9E9
| 200273 ||  || — || December 12, 1999 || Socorro || LINEAR || — || align=right | 4.0 km || 
|-id=274 bgcolor=#E9E9E9
| 200274 ||  || — || December 12, 1999 || Socorro || LINEAR || POS || align=right | 4.7 km || 
|-id=275 bgcolor=#E9E9E9
| 200275 ||  || — || December 13, 1999 || Socorro || LINEAR || GEF || align=right | 4.4 km || 
|-id=276 bgcolor=#E9E9E9
| 200276 ||  || — || December 13, 1999 || Kitt Peak || Spacewatch || — || align=right | 4.4 km || 
|-id=277 bgcolor=#E9E9E9
| 200277 ||  || — || December 13, 1999 || Kitt Peak || Spacewatch || GEF || align=right | 2.1 km || 
|-id=278 bgcolor=#E9E9E9
| 200278 ||  || — || December 15, 1999 || Kitt Peak || Spacewatch || MAR || align=right | 1.9 km || 
|-id=279 bgcolor=#E9E9E9
| 200279 ||  || — || December 5, 1999 || Kitt Peak || Spacewatch || — || align=right | 3.1 km || 
|-id=280 bgcolor=#E9E9E9
| 200280 ||  || — || December 3, 1999 || Socorro || LINEAR || — || align=right | 4.2 km || 
|-id=281 bgcolor=#E9E9E9
| 200281 ||  || — || December 9, 1999 || Kitt Peak || Spacewatch || — || align=right | 3.7 km || 
|-id=282 bgcolor=#E9E9E9
| 200282 ||  || — || December 28, 1999 || Prescott || P. G. Comba || GEF || align=right | 2.1 km || 
|-id=283 bgcolor=#E9E9E9
| 200283 ||  || — || December 27, 1999 || Kitt Peak || Spacewatch || — || align=right | 3.2 km || 
|-id=284 bgcolor=#E9E9E9
| 200284 ||  || — || December 27, 1999 || Kitt Peak || Spacewatch || NEM || align=right | 3.7 km || 
|-id=285 bgcolor=#E9E9E9
| 200285 ||  || — || December 27, 1999 || Kitt Peak || Spacewatch || — || align=right | 2.9 km || 
|-id=286 bgcolor=#E9E9E9
| 200286 ||  || — || January 2, 2000 || Višnjan Observatory || K. Korlević || — || align=right | 5.5 km || 
|-id=287 bgcolor=#E9E9E9
| 200287 ||  || — || January 6, 2000 || Olathe || Olathe || INO || align=right | 2.2 km || 
|-id=288 bgcolor=#E9E9E9
| 200288 ||  || — || January 4, 2000 || Socorro || LINEAR || JUN || align=right | 2.3 km || 
|-id=289 bgcolor=#E9E9E9
| 200289 ||  || — || January 5, 2000 || Socorro || LINEAR || INO || align=right | 1.8 km || 
|-id=290 bgcolor=#E9E9E9
| 200290 ||  || — || January 5, 2000 || Socorro || LINEAR || GEF || align=right | 4.2 km || 
|-id=291 bgcolor=#E9E9E9
| 200291 ||  || — || January 5, 2000 || Socorro || LINEAR || — || align=right | 4.0 km || 
|-id=292 bgcolor=#E9E9E9
| 200292 ||  || — || January 5, 2000 || Socorro || LINEAR || — || align=right | 4.2 km || 
|-id=293 bgcolor=#E9E9E9
| 200293 ||  || — || January 7, 2000 || Socorro || LINEAR || — || align=right | 6.9 km || 
|-id=294 bgcolor=#E9E9E9
| 200294 ||  || — || January 15, 2000 || Višnjan Observatory || K. Korlević || — || align=right | 3.7 km || 
|-id=295 bgcolor=#E9E9E9
| 200295 ||  || — || January 6, 2000 || Kitt Peak || Spacewatch || — || align=right | 3.6 km || 
|-id=296 bgcolor=#E9E9E9
| 200296 ||  || — || January 8, 2000 || Kitt Peak || Spacewatch || — || align=right | 4.5 km || 
|-id=297 bgcolor=#d6d6d6
| 200297 ||  || — || January 8, 2000 || Kitt Peak || Spacewatch || KAR || align=right | 1.9 km || 
|-id=298 bgcolor=#E9E9E9
| 200298 ||  || — || January 3, 2000 || Socorro || LINEAR || — || align=right | 4.0 km || 
|-id=299 bgcolor=#E9E9E9
| 200299 ||  || — || January 5, 2000 || Socorro || LINEAR || — || align=right | 3.6 km || 
|-id=300 bgcolor=#E9E9E9
| 200300 ||  || — || January 28, 2000 || Oizumi || T. Kobayashi || — || align=right | 3.4 km || 
|}

200301–200400 

|-bgcolor=#d6d6d6
| 200301 ||  || — || February 2, 2000 || Socorro || LINEAR || — || align=right | 4.8 km || 
|-id=302 bgcolor=#d6d6d6
| 200302 ||  || — || February 8, 2000 || Kitt Peak || Spacewatch || — || align=right | 3.9 km || 
|-id=303 bgcolor=#E9E9E9
| 200303 ||  || — || February 9, 2000 || Višnjan Observatory || K. Korlević || — || align=right | 2.4 km || 
|-id=304 bgcolor=#d6d6d6
| 200304 ||  || — || February 5, 2000 || Catalina || CSS || — || align=right | 7.5 km || 
|-id=305 bgcolor=#E9E9E9
| 200305 ||  || — || February 3, 2000 || Socorro || LINEAR || — || align=right | 4.3 km || 
|-id=306 bgcolor=#d6d6d6
| 200306 ||  || — || February 4, 2000 || Kitt Peak || Spacewatch || KAR || align=right | 1.6 km || 
|-id=307 bgcolor=#d6d6d6
| 200307 ||  || — || February 29, 2000 || Socorro || LINEAR || — || align=right | 3.5 km || 
|-id=308 bgcolor=#d6d6d6
| 200308 ||  || — || February 29, 2000 || Socorro || LINEAR || — || align=right | 3.0 km || 
|-id=309 bgcolor=#d6d6d6
| 200309 ||  || — || February 26, 2000 || Kitt Peak || Spacewatch || — || align=right | 2.6 km || 
|-id=310 bgcolor=#d6d6d6
| 200310 ||  || — || February 28, 2000 || Kitt Peak || Spacewatch || — || align=right | 4.8 km || 
|-id=311 bgcolor=#fefefe
| 200311 ||  || — || March 3, 2000 || Socorro || LINEAR || — || align=right data-sort-value="0.83" | 830 m || 
|-id=312 bgcolor=#d6d6d6
| 200312 ||  || — || March 10, 2000 || Socorro || LINEAR || — || align=right | 3.9 km || 
|-id=313 bgcolor=#d6d6d6
| 200313 ||  || — || March 10, 2000 || Socorro || LINEAR || — || align=right | 3.9 km || 
|-id=314 bgcolor=#fefefe
| 200314 ||  || — || March 10, 2000 || Kitt Peak || Spacewatch || — || align=right | 3.0 km || 
|-id=315 bgcolor=#d6d6d6
| 200315 ||  || — || March 11, 2000 || Anderson Mesa || LONEOS || — || align=right | 5.7 km || 
|-id=316 bgcolor=#d6d6d6
| 200316 ||  || — || March 4, 2000 || Socorro || LINEAR || BRA || align=right | 3.0 km || 
|-id=317 bgcolor=#fefefe
| 200317 ||  || — || March 2, 2000 || Kitt Peak || Spacewatch || — || align=right data-sort-value="0.89" | 890 m || 
|-id=318 bgcolor=#fefefe
| 200318 ||  || — || March 4, 2000 || Kitt Peak || Spacewatch || — || align=right | 1.4 km || 
|-id=319 bgcolor=#d6d6d6
| 200319 ||  || — || March 29, 2000 || Socorro || LINEAR || — || align=right | 4.8 km || 
|-id=320 bgcolor=#d6d6d6
| 200320 ||  || — || March 27, 2000 || Kitt Peak || Spacewatch || — || align=right | 2.7 km || 
|-id=321 bgcolor=#fefefe
| 200321 ||  || — || April 5, 2000 || Socorro || LINEAR || — || align=right | 1.5 km || 
|-id=322 bgcolor=#fefefe
| 200322 ||  || — || April 5, 2000 || Socorro || LINEAR || — || align=right | 1.1 km || 
|-id=323 bgcolor=#fefefe
| 200323 ||  || — || April 5, 2000 || Socorro || LINEAR || — || align=right data-sort-value="0.99" | 990 m || 
|-id=324 bgcolor=#d6d6d6
| 200324 ||  || — || April 5, 2000 || Socorro || LINEAR || — || align=right | 4.6 km || 
|-id=325 bgcolor=#fefefe
| 200325 ||  || — || April 5, 2000 || Socorro || LINEAR || — || align=right | 1.3 km || 
|-id=326 bgcolor=#fefefe
| 200326 ||  || — || April 5, 2000 || Socorro || LINEAR || — || align=right | 1.1 km || 
|-id=327 bgcolor=#d6d6d6
| 200327 ||  || — || April 5, 2000 || Socorro || LINEAR || — || align=right | 4.2 km || 
|-id=328 bgcolor=#fefefe
| 200328 ||  || — || April 5, 2000 || Socorro || LINEAR || — || align=right | 1.4 km || 
|-id=329 bgcolor=#d6d6d6
| 200329 ||  || — || April 3, 2000 || Anderson Mesa || LONEOS || EMA || align=right | 5.9 km || 
|-id=330 bgcolor=#d6d6d6
| 200330 ||  || — || April 5, 2000 || Kitt Peak || Spacewatch || — || align=right | 4.3 km || 
|-id=331 bgcolor=#d6d6d6
| 200331 ||  || — || April 5, 2000 || Kitt Peak || Spacewatch || — || align=right | 5.1 km || 
|-id=332 bgcolor=#d6d6d6
| 200332 ||  || — || April 8, 2000 || Socorro || LINEAR || — || align=right | 4.8 km || 
|-id=333 bgcolor=#d6d6d6
| 200333 ||  || — || April 4, 2000 || Anderson Mesa || LONEOS || — || align=right | 3.9 km || 
|-id=334 bgcolor=#fefefe
| 200334 ||  || — || April 30, 2000 || Eskridge || Farpoint Obs. || — || align=right | 1.5 km || 
|-id=335 bgcolor=#fefefe
| 200335 ||  || — || April 25, 2000 || Kitt Peak || Spacewatch || — || align=right | 1.0 km || 
|-id=336 bgcolor=#d6d6d6
| 200336 ||  || — || April 24, 2000 || Anderson Mesa || LONEOS || — || align=right | 4.5 km || 
|-id=337 bgcolor=#d6d6d6
| 200337 ||  || — || April 28, 2000 || Socorro || LINEAR || — || align=right | 3.0 km || 
|-id=338 bgcolor=#fefefe
| 200338 ||  || — || April 29, 2000 || Kitt Peak || Spacewatch || — || align=right | 1.1 km || 
|-id=339 bgcolor=#fefefe
| 200339 ||  || — || April 29, 2000 || Socorro || LINEAR || — || align=right | 1.0 km || 
|-id=340 bgcolor=#d6d6d6
| 200340 ||  || — || April 29, 2000 || Socorro || LINEAR || HYG || align=right | 3.9 km || 
|-id=341 bgcolor=#fefefe
| 200341 ||  || — || April 29, 2000 || Socorro || LINEAR || — || align=right | 1.2 km || 
|-id=342 bgcolor=#d6d6d6
| 200342 ||  || — || April 28, 2000 || Kitt Peak || Spacewatch || — || align=right | 5.5 km || 
|-id=343 bgcolor=#fefefe
| 200343 || 2000 JV || — || May 1, 2000 || Socorro || LINEAR || — || align=right | 4.7 km || 
|-id=344 bgcolor=#d6d6d6
| 200344 ||  || — || May 1, 2000 || Socorro || LINEAR || — || align=right | 5.7 km || 
|-id=345 bgcolor=#E9E9E9
| 200345 ||  || — || May 1, 2000 || Socorro || LINEAR || — || align=right | 4.7 km || 
|-id=346 bgcolor=#d6d6d6
| 200346 ||  || — || May 4, 2000 || Socorro || LINEAR || — || align=right | 5.7 km || 
|-id=347 bgcolor=#fefefe
| 200347 ||  || — || May 11, 2000 || Kitt Peak || Spacewatch || — || align=right data-sort-value="0.72" | 720 m || 
|-id=348 bgcolor=#fefefe
| 200348 ||  || — || May 10, 2000 || Socorro || LINEAR || FLO || align=right | 1.2 km || 
|-id=349 bgcolor=#fefefe
| 200349 ||  || — || May 7, 2000 || Socorro || LINEAR || ERI || align=right | 3.0 km || 
|-id=350 bgcolor=#fefefe
| 200350 ||  || — || May 28, 2000 || Socorro || LINEAR || — || align=right | 2.7 km || 
|-id=351 bgcolor=#fefefe
| 200351 ||  || — || May 27, 2000 || Socorro || LINEAR || V || align=right data-sort-value="0.99" | 990 m || 
|-id=352 bgcolor=#d6d6d6
| 200352 ||  || — || May 24, 2000 || Kitt Peak || Spacewatch || — || align=right | 5.6 km || 
|-id=353 bgcolor=#fefefe
| 200353 ||  || — || May 24, 2000 || Kitt Peak || Spacewatch || V || align=right data-sort-value="0.80" | 800 m || 
|-id=354 bgcolor=#fefefe
| 200354 ||  || — || May 31, 2000 || Kitt Peak || Spacewatch || — || align=right | 1.0 km || 
|-id=355 bgcolor=#d6d6d6
| 200355 ||  || — || May 27, 2000 || Socorro || LINEAR || THB || align=right | 4.7 km || 
|-id=356 bgcolor=#d6d6d6
| 200356 ||  || — || May 31, 2000 || Kitt Peak || Spacewatch || EOS || align=right | 2.7 km || 
|-id=357 bgcolor=#d6d6d6
| 200357 ||  || — || May 23, 2000 || Anderson Mesa || LONEOS || — || align=right | 3.6 km || 
|-id=358 bgcolor=#fefefe
| 200358 ||  || — || July 30, 2000 || Socorro || LINEAR || KLI || align=right | 4.2 km || 
|-id=359 bgcolor=#fefefe
| 200359 ||  || — || August 1, 2000 || Ondřejov || P. Pravec, L. Kotková || V || align=right | 1.1 km || 
|-id=360 bgcolor=#E9E9E9
| 200360 ||  || — || August 4, 2000 || Socorro || LINEAR || — || align=right | 1.5 km || 
|-id=361 bgcolor=#E9E9E9
| 200361 ||  || — || August 3, 2000 || Socorro || LINEAR || — || align=right | 1.6 km || 
|-id=362 bgcolor=#fefefe
| 200362 || 2000 QL || — || August 21, 2000 || Prescott || P. G. Comba || MAS || align=right | 1.2 km || 
|-id=363 bgcolor=#fefefe
| 200363 ||  || — || August 24, 2000 || Socorro || LINEAR || H || align=right data-sort-value="0.71" | 710 m || 
|-id=364 bgcolor=#E9E9E9
| 200364 ||  || — || August 23, 2000 || Reedy Creek || J. Broughton || — || align=right | 1.6 km || 
|-id=365 bgcolor=#d6d6d6
| 200365 ||  || — || August 24, 2000 || Socorro || LINEAR || VER || align=right | 6.1 km || 
|-id=366 bgcolor=#fefefe
| 200366 ||  || — || August 24, 2000 || Socorro || LINEAR || NYS || align=right | 1.0 km || 
|-id=367 bgcolor=#fefefe
| 200367 ||  || — || August 24, 2000 || Socorro || LINEAR || — || align=right | 1.9 km || 
|-id=368 bgcolor=#E9E9E9
| 200368 ||  || — || August 24, 2000 || Socorro || LINEAR || — || align=right | 1.4 km || 
|-id=369 bgcolor=#fefefe
| 200369 ||  || — || August 26, 2000 || Socorro || LINEAR || NYS || align=right | 1.0 km || 
|-id=370 bgcolor=#fefefe
| 200370 ||  || — || August 28, 2000 || Socorro || LINEAR || V || align=right | 1.2 km || 
|-id=371 bgcolor=#fefefe
| 200371 ||  || — || August 28, 2000 || Socorro || LINEAR || V || align=right | 1.4 km || 
|-id=372 bgcolor=#fefefe
| 200372 ||  || — || August 24, 2000 || Socorro || LINEAR || V || align=right | 1.2 km || 
|-id=373 bgcolor=#fefefe
| 200373 ||  || — || August 25, 2000 || Socorro || LINEAR || — || align=right | 1.7 km || 
|-id=374 bgcolor=#fefefe
| 200374 ||  || — || August 25, 2000 || Socorro || LINEAR || — || align=right | 1.3 km || 
|-id=375 bgcolor=#E9E9E9
| 200375 ||  || — || August 25, 2000 || Socorro || LINEAR || — || align=right | 1.4 km || 
|-id=376 bgcolor=#E9E9E9
| 200376 ||  || — || August 28, 2000 || Socorro || LINEAR || — || align=right | 1.7 km || 
|-id=377 bgcolor=#fefefe
| 200377 ||  || — || August 25, 2000 || Socorro || LINEAR || V || align=right | 1.3 km || 
|-id=378 bgcolor=#fefefe
| 200378 ||  || — || August 26, 2000 || Socorro || LINEAR || FLO || align=right | 1.1 km || 
|-id=379 bgcolor=#E9E9E9
| 200379 ||  || — || August 29, 2000 || Socorro || LINEAR || — || align=right | 1.1 km || 
|-id=380 bgcolor=#fefefe
| 200380 ||  || — || August 31, 2000 || Socorro || LINEAR || V || align=right | 1.2 km || 
|-id=381 bgcolor=#fefefe
| 200381 ||  || — || August 31, 2000 || Socorro || LINEAR || V || align=right data-sort-value="0.94" | 940 m || 
|-id=382 bgcolor=#fefefe
| 200382 ||  || — || August 31, 2000 || Socorro || LINEAR || — || align=right | 1.2 km || 
|-id=383 bgcolor=#E9E9E9
| 200383 ||  || — || August 31, 2000 || Socorro || LINEAR || — || align=right | 1.9 km || 
|-id=384 bgcolor=#E9E9E9
| 200384 ||  || — || August 31, 2000 || Socorro || LINEAR || — || align=right | 1.1 km || 
|-id=385 bgcolor=#fefefe
| 200385 ||  || — || August 31, 2000 || Socorro || LINEAR || FLO || align=right | 1.2 km || 
|-id=386 bgcolor=#fefefe
| 200386 ||  || — || August 29, 2000 || Socorro || LINEAR || — || align=right | 1.1 km || 
|-id=387 bgcolor=#fefefe
| 200387 ||  || — || August 31, 2000 || Socorro || LINEAR || NYS || align=right data-sort-value="0.91" | 910 m || 
|-id=388 bgcolor=#fefefe
| 200388 ||  || — || August 26, 2000 || Kitt Peak || Spacewatch || V || align=right | 1.0 km || 
|-id=389 bgcolor=#fefefe
| 200389 ||  || — || August 28, 2000 || Socorro || LINEAR || — || align=right | 1.8 km || 
|-id=390 bgcolor=#fefefe
| 200390 ||  || — || September 1, 2000 || Socorro || LINEAR || — || align=right | 1.5 km || 
|-id=391 bgcolor=#fefefe
| 200391 ||  || — || September 1, 2000 || Socorro || LINEAR || — || align=right | 1.9 km || 
|-id=392 bgcolor=#E9E9E9
| 200392 ||  || — || September 1, 2000 || Socorro || LINEAR || — || align=right | 1.6 km || 
|-id=393 bgcolor=#fefefe
| 200393 ||  || — || September 1, 2000 || Socorro || LINEAR || V || align=right | 1.2 km || 
|-id=394 bgcolor=#fefefe
| 200394 ||  || — || September 5, 2000 || Socorro || LINEAR || — || align=right | 2.1 km || 
|-id=395 bgcolor=#fefefe
| 200395 ||  || — || September 3, 2000 || Socorro || LINEAR || NYS || align=right | 1.3 km || 
|-id=396 bgcolor=#E9E9E9
| 200396 ||  || — || September 1, 2000 || Socorro || LINEAR || EUN || align=right | 2.5 km || 
|-id=397 bgcolor=#fefefe
| 200397 ||  || — || September 4, 2000 || Socorro || LINEAR || NYS || align=right | 1.3 km || 
|-id=398 bgcolor=#fefefe
| 200398 ||  || — || September 3, 2000 || Socorro || LINEAR || — || align=right | 1.5 km || 
|-id=399 bgcolor=#fefefe
| 200399 ||  || — || September 5, 2000 || Anderson Mesa || LONEOS || — || align=right | 1.9 km || 
|-id=400 bgcolor=#fefefe
| 200400 ||  || — || September 26, 2000 || Bisei SG Center || BATTeRS || — || align=right | 1.4 km || 
|}

200401–200500 

|-bgcolor=#E9E9E9
| 200401 ||  || — || September 22, 2000 || Socorro || LINEAR || EUN || align=right | 2.0 km || 
|-id=402 bgcolor=#fefefe
| 200402 ||  || — || September 24, 2000 || Socorro || LINEAR || H || align=right | 1.1 km || 
|-id=403 bgcolor=#fefefe
| 200403 ||  || — || September 24, 2000 || Socorro || LINEAR || NYS || align=right | 1.2 km || 
|-id=404 bgcolor=#fefefe
| 200404 ||  || — || September 24, 2000 || Socorro || LINEAR || NYS || align=right | 1.0 km || 
|-id=405 bgcolor=#fefefe
| 200405 ||  || — || September 24, 2000 || Socorro || LINEAR || MAS || align=right | 1.3 km || 
|-id=406 bgcolor=#fefefe
| 200406 ||  || — || September 24, 2000 || Socorro || LINEAR || — || align=right | 1.7 km || 
|-id=407 bgcolor=#fefefe
| 200407 ||  || — || September 24, 2000 || Socorro || LINEAR || — || align=right | 1.5 km || 
|-id=408 bgcolor=#fefefe
| 200408 ||  || — || September 24, 2000 || Socorro || LINEAR || — || align=right | 2.2 km || 
|-id=409 bgcolor=#fefefe
| 200409 ||  || — || September 23, 2000 || Socorro || LINEAR || — || align=right | 1.7 km || 
|-id=410 bgcolor=#fefefe
| 200410 ||  || — || September 24, 2000 || Socorro || LINEAR || NYS || align=right data-sort-value="0.96" | 960 m || 
|-id=411 bgcolor=#fefefe
| 200411 ||  || — || September 24, 2000 || Socorro || LINEAR || — || align=right | 1.2 km || 
|-id=412 bgcolor=#fefefe
| 200412 ||  || — || September 24, 2000 || Socorro || LINEAR || MAS || align=right | 1.3 km || 
|-id=413 bgcolor=#fefefe
| 200413 ||  || — || September 24, 2000 || Socorro || LINEAR || — || align=right | 2.0 km || 
|-id=414 bgcolor=#E9E9E9
| 200414 ||  || — || September 23, 2000 || Socorro || LINEAR || RAF || align=right | 1.4 km || 
|-id=415 bgcolor=#fefefe
| 200415 ||  || — || September 27, 2000 || Kitt Peak || Spacewatch || V || align=right | 1.2 km || 
|-id=416 bgcolor=#fefefe
| 200416 ||  || — || September 19, 2000 || Haleakala || NEAT || V || align=right data-sort-value="0.97" | 970 m || 
|-id=417 bgcolor=#d6d6d6
| 200417 ||  || — || September 30, 2000 || Socorro || LINEAR || Tj (2.84) || align=right | 11 km || 
|-id=418 bgcolor=#fefefe
| 200418 ||  || — || September 24, 2000 || Socorro || LINEAR || — || align=right | 1.6 km || 
|-id=419 bgcolor=#fefefe
| 200419 ||  || — || September 24, 2000 || Socorro || LINEAR || — || align=right | 1.5 km || 
|-id=420 bgcolor=#fefefe
| 200420 ||  || — || September 25, 2000 || Socorro || LINEAR || — || align=right | 3.0 km || 
|-id=421 bgcolor=#fefefe
| 200421 ||  || — || September 26, 2000 || Socorro || LINEAR || PHO || align=right | 1.7 km || 
|-id=422 bgcolor=#fefefe
| 200422 ||  || — || September 28, 2000 || Socorro || LINEAR || — || align=right | 1.7 km || 
|-id=423 bgcolor=#fefefe
| 200423 ||  || — || September 21, 2000 || Socorro || LINEAR || — || align=right | 1.5 km || 
|-id=424 bgcolor=#fefefe
| 200424 ||  || — || September 24, 2000 || Socorro || LINEAR || MAS || align=right | 1.2 km || 
|-id=425 bgcolor=#fefefe
| 200425 ||  || — || September 27, 2000 || Socorro || LINEAR || — || align=right | 1.4 km || 
|-id=426 bgcolor=#fefefe
| 200426 ||  || — || September 28, 2000 || Socorro || LINEAR || ERI || align=right | 2.6 km || 
|-id=427 bgcolor=#fefefe
| 200427 ||  || — || September 26, 2000 || Haleakala || NEAT || V || align=right | 1.1 km || 
|-id=428 bgcolor=#fefefe
| 200428 ||  || — || September 25, 2000 || Socorro || LINEAR || — || align=right | 1.3 km || 
|-id=429 bgcolor=#fefefe
| 200429 ||  || — || September 24, 2000 || Socorro || LINEAR || NYS || align=right data-sort-value="0.88" | 880 m || 
|-id=430 bgcolor=#E9E9E9
| 200430 ||  || — || October 1, 2000 || Socorro || LINEAR || — || align=right | 1.4 km || 
|-id=431 bgcolor=#fefefe
| 200431 ||  || — || October 2, 2000 || Socorro || LINEAR || NYS || align=right data-sort-value="0.87" | 870 m || 
|-id=432 bgcolor=#fefefe
| 200432 ||  || — || October 4, 2000 || Socorro || LINEAR || H || align=right | 1.1 km || 
|-id=433 bgcolor=#E9E9E9
| 200433 ||  || — || October 6, 2000 || Anderson Mesa || LONEOS || — || align=right | 1.5 km || 
|-id=434 bgcolor=#fefefe
| 200434 ||  || — || October 31, 2000 || Socorro || LINEAR || — || align=right | 3.7 km || 
|-id=435 bgcolor=#fefefe
| 200435 ||  || — || October 24, 2000 || Socorro || LINEAR || — || align=right | 1.4 km || 
|-id=436 bgcolor=#fefefe
| 200436 ||  || — || October 24, 2000 || Socorro || LINEAR || — || align=right | 1.2 km || 
|-id=437 bgcolor=#fefefe
| 200437 ||  || — || October 24, 2000 || Socorro || LINEAR || V || align=right | 1.3 km || 
|-id=438 bgcolor=#fefefe
| 200438 ||  || — || October 25, 2000 || Socorro || LINEAR || — || align=right | 1.6 km || 
|-id=439 bgcolor=#fefefe
| 200439 ||  || — || October 31, 2000 || Socorro || LINEAR || NYS || align=right | 1.0 km || 
|-id=440 bgcolor=#fefefe
| 200440 ||  || — || October 31, 2000 || Socorro || LINEAR || NYS || align=right | 1.1 km || 
|-id=441 bgcolor=#d6d6d6
| 200441 ||  || — || October 30, 2000 || Socorro || LINEAR || HIL3:2 || align=right | 5.6 km || 
|-id=442 bgcolor=#E9E9E9
| 200442 ||  || — || November 1, 2000 || Socorro || LINEAR || — || align=right | 1.4 km || 
|-id=443 bgcolor=#fefefe
| 200443 ||  || — || November 1, 2000 || Socorro || LINEAR || NYS || align=right | 1.2 km || 
|-id=444 bgcolor=#fefefe
| 200444 ||  || — || November 1, 2000 || Socorro || LINEAR || NYS || align=right | 1.1 km || 
|-id=445 bgcolor=#d6d6d6
| 200445 ||  || — || November 1, 2000 || Socorro || LINEAR || 3:2 || align=right | 6.3 km || 
|-id=446 bgcolor=#E9E9E9
| 200446 ||  || — || November 2, 2000 || Socorro || LINEAR || — || align=right | 2.7 km || 
|-id=447 bgcolor=#fefefe
| 200447 ||  || — || November 21, 2000 || Kitt Peak || Spacewatch || H || align=right data-sort-value="0.78" | 780 m || 
|-id=448 bgcolor=#FA8072
| 200448 ||  || — || November 20, 2000 || Socorro || LINEAR || H || align=right | 1.4 km || 
|-id=449 bgcolor=#E9E9E9
| 200449 ||  || — || November 19, 2000 || Socorro || LINEAR || — || align=right | 1.8 km || 
|-id=450 bgcolor=#E9E9E9
| 200450 ||  || — || November 21, 2000 || Socorro || LINEAR || — || align=right | 1.5 km || 
|-id=451 bgcolor=#E9E9E9
| 200451 ||  || — || November 21, 2000 || Needville || Needville Obs. || — || align=right | 1.5 km || 
|-id=452 bgcolor=#E9E9E9
| 200452 ||  || — || November 21, 2000 || Socorro || LINEAR || — || align=right | 2.1 km || 
|-id=453 bgcolor=#E9E9E9
| 200453 ||  || — || November 21, 2000 || Socorro || LINEAR || — || align=right | 3.7 km || 
|-id=454 bgcolor=#E9E9E9
| 200454 ||  || — || November 21, 2000 || Socorro || LINEAR || — || align=right | 2.0 km || 
|-id=455 bgcolor=#fefefe
| 200455 ||  || — || November 20, 2000 || Socorro || LINEAR || V || align=right | 1.1 km || 
|-id=456 bgcolor=#fefefe
| 200456 ||  || — || November 21, 2000 || Socorro || LINEAR || NYS || align=right | 1.2 km || 
|-id=457 bgcolor=#E9E9E9
| 200457 ||  || — || November 21, 2000 || Socorro || LINEAR || — || align=right | 1.7 km || 
|-id=458 bgcolor=#fefefe
| 200458 ||  || — || November 20, 2000 || Socorro || LINEAR || H || align=right | 1.3 km || 
|-id=459 bgcolor=#E9E9E9
| 200459 ||  || — || November 20, 2000 || Socorro || LINEAR || — || align=right | 2.1 km || 
|-id=460 bgcolor=#E9E9E9
| 200460 ||  || — || November 20, 2000 || Socorro || LINEAR || — || align=right | 2.6 km || 
|-id=461 bgcolor=#fefefe
| 200461 ||  || — || November 20, 2000 || Socorro || LINEAR || — || align=right | 2.0 km || 
|-id=462 bgcolor=#E9E9E9
| 200462 ||  || — || November 20, 2000 || Socorro || LINEAR || — || align=right | 2.2 km || 
|-id=463 bgcolor=#fefefe
| 200463 ||  || — || November 19, 2000 || Socorro || LINEAR || — || align=right | 1.6 km || 
|-id=464 bgcolor=#fefefe
| 200464 ||  || — || November 19, 2000 || Socorro || LINEAR || V || align=right | 1.5 km || 
|-id=465 bgcolor=#d6d6d6
| 200465 ||  || — || November 21, 2000 || Socorro || LINEAR || SHU3:2 || align=right | 7.8 km || 
|-id=466 bgcolor=#E9E9E9
| 200466 ||  || — || November 29, 2000 || Kitt Peak || Spacewatch || — || align=right | 4.5 km || 
|-id=467 bgcolor=#fefefe
| 200467 ||  || — || November 23, 2000 || Haleakala || NEAT || V || align=right | 1.3 km || 
|-id=468 bgcolor=#fefefe
| 200468 ||  || — || November 18, 2000 || Anderson Mesa || LONEOS || — || align=right | 2.5 km || 
|-id=469 bgcolor=#E9E9E9
| 200469 ||  || — || November 19, 2000 || Anderson Mesa || LONEOS || EUN || align=right | 1.9 km || 
|-id=470 bgcolor=#E9E9E9
| 200470 ||  || — || December 4, 2000 || Socorro || LINEAR || — || align=right | 4.6 km || 
|-id=471 bgcolor=#E9E9E9
| 200471 ||  || — || December 4, 2000 || Socorro || LINEAR || — || align=right | 4.7 km || 
|-id=472 bgcolor=#E9E9E9
| 200472 ||  || — || December 4, 2000 || Socorro || LINEAR || EUN || align=right | 2.6 km || 
|-id=473 bgcolor=#FA8072
| 200473 ||  || — || December 4, 2000 || Socorro || LINEAR || H || align=right | 1.4 km || 
|-id=474 bgcolor=#fefefe
| 200474 ||  || — || December 15, 2000 || Socorro || LINEAR || H || align=right | 1.5 km || 
|-id=475 bgcolor=#E9E9E9
| 200475 ||  || — || December 15, 2000 || Socorro || LINEAR || — || align=right | 1.9 km || 
|-id=476 bgcolor=#fefefe
| 200476 ||  || — || December 17, 2000 || Socorro || LINEAR || H || align=right | 1.3 km || 
|-id=477 bgcolor=#fefefe
| 200477 ||  || — || December 19, 2000 || Socorro || LINEAR || H || align=right | 1.0 km || 
|-id=478 bgcolor=#E9E9E9
| 200478 ||  || — || December 19, 2000 || Haleakala || NEAT || EUN || align=right | 2.5 km || 
|-id=479 bgcolor=#E9E9E9
| 200479 ||  || — || December 22, 2000 || Ondřejov || P. Kušnirák, P. Pravec || — || align=right | 1.7 km || 
|-id=480 bgcolor=#fefefe
| 200480 ||  || — || December 21, 2000 || Socorro || LINEAR || H || align=right | 1.1 km || 
|-id=481 bgcolor=#E9E9E9
| 200481 ||  || — || December 20, 2000 || Socorro || LINEAR || slow || align=right | 5.1 km || 
|-id=482 bgcolor=#E9E9E9
| 200482 ||  || — || December 28, 2000 || Kitt Peak || Spacewatch || — || align=right | 4.1 km || 
|-id=483 bgcolor=#E9E9E9
| 200483 ||  || — || December 23, 2000 || Socorro || LINEAR || GER || align=right | 2.1 km || 
|-id=484 bgcolor=#FA8072
| 200484 ||  || — || December 24, 2000 || Haleakala || NEAT || H || align=right | 1.0 km || 
|-id=485 bgcolor=#E9E9E9
| 200485 ||  || — || December 30, 2000 || Socorro || LINEAR || MAR || align=right | 2.7 km || 
|-id=486 bgcolor=#E9E9E9
| 200486 ||  || — || December 30, 2000 || Socorro || LINEAR || — || align=right | 2.1 km || 
|-id=487 bgcolor=#E9E9E9
| 200487 ||  || — || December 30, 2000 || Socorro || LINEAR || — || align=right | 2.9 km || 
|-id=488 bgcolor=#E9E9E9
| 200488 ||  || — || December 30, 2000 || Socorro || LINEAR || — || align=right | 1.7 km || 
|-id=489 bgcolor=#E9E9E9
| 200489 ||  || — || December 30, 2000 || Socorro || LINEAR || JUN || align=right | 2.5 km || 
|-id=490 bgcolor=#E9E9E9
| 200490 ||  || — || December 30, 2000 || Socorro || LINEAR || — || align=right | 2.3 km || 
|-id=491 bgcolor=#E9E9E9
| 200491 ||  || — || December 30, 2000 || Socorro || LINEAR || RAF || align=right | 2.1 km || 
|-id=492 bgcolor=#E9E9E9
| 200492 ||  || — || December 28, 2000 || Socorro || LINEAR || GAL || align=right | 2.9 km || 
|-id=493 bgcolor=#E9E9E9
| 200493 ||  || — || December 30, 2000 || Socorro || LINEAR || — || align=right | 1.5 km || 
|-id=494 bgcolor=#E9E9E9
| 200494 ||  || — || December 30, 2000 || Socorro || LINEAR || EUN || align=right | 2.4 km || 
|-id=495 bgcolor=#E9E9E9
| 200495 ||  || — || December 30, 2000 || Socorro || LINEAR || — || align=right | 4.4 km || 
|-id=496 bgcolor=#fefefe
| 200496 ||  || — || December 30, 2000 || Socorro || LINEAR || — || align=right | 1.6 km || 
|-id=497 bgcolor=#E9E9E9
| 200497 ||  || — || December 30, 2000 || Socorro || LINEAR || MAR || align=right | 1.9 km || 
|-id=498 bgcolor=#E9E9E9
| 200498 ||  || — || December 19, 2000 || Kitt Peak || Spacewatch || — || align=right | 2.5 km || 
|-id=499 bgcolor=#E9E9E9
| 200499 ||  || — || December 30, 2000 || Socorro || LINEAR || — || align=right | 2.0 km || 
|-id=500 bgcolor=#E9E9E9
| 200500 ||  || — || January 2, 2001 || Socorro || LINEAR || — || align=right | 2.1 km || 
|}

200501–200600 

|-bgcolor=#E9E9E9
| 200501 ||  || — || January 2, 2001 || Socorro || LINEAR || — || align=right | 1.6 km || 
|-id=502 bgcolor=#E9E9E9
| 200502 ||  || — || January 2, 2001 || Socorro || LINEAR || — || align=right | 1.7 km || 
|-id=503 bgcolor=#fefefe
| 200503 ||  || — || January 5, 2001 || Socorro || LINEAR || H || align=right | 1.0 km || 
|-id=504 bgcolor=#E9E9E9
| 200504 ||  || — || January 4, 2001 || Fair Oaks Ranch || J. V. McClusky || BAR || align=right | 1.9 km || 
|-id=505 bgcolor=#E9E9E9
| 200505 ||  || — || January 5, 2001 || Socorro || LINEAR || — || align=right | 4.7 km || 
|-id=506 bgcolor=#E9E9E9
| 200506 ||  || — || January 4, 2001 || Anderson Mesa || LONEOS || — || align=right | 3.1 km || 
|-id=507 bgcolor=#E9E9E9
| 200507 ||  || — || January 18, 2001 || Socorro || LINEAR || ADE || align=right | 4.7 km || 
|-id=508 bgcolor=#E9E9E9
| 200508 ||  || — || January 18, 2001 || Socorro || LINEAR || — || align=right | 3.2 km || 
|-id=509 bgcolor=#E9E9E9
| 200509 ||  || — || January 19, 2001 || Socorro || LINEAR || MAR || align=right | 2.0 km || 
|-id=510 bgcolor=#fefefe
| 200510 ||  || — || January 19, 2001 || Socorro || LINEAR || H || align=right | 1.1 km || 
|-id=511 bgcolor=#E9E9E9
| 200511 ||  || — || January 16, 2001 || Gnosca || S. Sposetti || — || align=right | 1.3 km || 
|-id=512 bgcolor=#E9E9E9
| 200512 ||  || — || January 20, 2001 || Socorro || LINEAR || — || align=right | 2.6 km || 
|-id=513 bgcolor=#E9E9E9
| 200513 ||  || — || January 24, 2001 || Socorro || LINEAR || — || align=right | 2.8 km || 
|-id=514 bgcolor=#E9E9E9
| 200514 ||  || — || January 17, 2001 || Haleakala || NEAT || JUN || align=right | 1.9 km || 
|-id=515 bgcolor=#E9E9E9
| 200515 ||  || — || January 21, 2001 || Socorro || LINEAR || — || align=right | 1.8 km || 
|-id=516 bgcolor=#E9E9E9
| 200516 ||  || — || January 30, 2001 || Socorro || LINEAR || — || align=right | 2.8 km || 
|-id=517 bgcolor=#E9E9E9
| 200517 ||  || — || January 26, 2001 || Kitt Peak || Spacewatch || — || align=right | 2.3 km || 
|-id=518 bgcolor=#E9E9E9
| 200518 ||  || — || January 24, 2001 || Socorro || LINEAR || — || align=right | 2.3 km || 
|-id=519 bgcolor=#fefefe
| 200519 || 2001 CJ || — || February 1, 2001 || Socorro || LINEAR || H || align=right data-sort-value="0.89" | 890 m || 
|-id=520 bgcolor=#E9E9E9
| 200520 ||  || — || February 1, 2001 || Socorro || LINEAR || — || align=right | 2.0 km || 
|-id=521 bgcolor=#E9E9E9
| 200521 ||  || — || February 1, 2001 || Socorro || LINEAR || — || align=right | 2.6 km || 
|-id=522 bgcolor=#E9E9E9
| 200522 ||  || — || February 2, 2001 || Socorro || LINEAR || — || align=right | 1.4 km || 
|-id=523 bgcolor=#E9E9E9
| 200523 ||  || — || February 1, 2001 || Anderson Mesa || LONEOS || MRX || align=right | 1.4 km || 
|-id=524 bgcolor=#E9E9E9
| 200524 ||  || — || February 1, 2001 || Socorro || LINEAR || — || align=right | 3.2 km || 
|-id=525 bgcolor=#E9E9E9
| 200525 ||  || — || February 1, 2001 || Haleakala || NEAT || — || align=right | 2.2 km || 
|-id=526 bgcolor=#fefefe
| 200526 ||  || — || February 13, 2001 || Socorro || LINEAR || H || align=right | 1.1 km || 
|-id=527 bgcolor=#E9E9E9
| 200527 ||  || — || February 13, 2001 || Socorro || LINEAR || EUN || align=right | 1.9 km || 
|-id=528 bgcolor=#E9E9E9
| 200528 ||  || — || February 15, 2001 || Socorro || LINEAR || GER || align=right | 2.4 km || 
|-id=529 bgcolor=#E9E9E9
| 200529 || 2001 DA || — || February 16, 2001 || Kleť || Kleť Obs. || — || align=right | 4.2 km || 
|-id=530 bgcolor=#E9E9E9
| 200530 ||  || — || February 18, 2001 || Višnjan Observatory || K. Korlević || — || align=right | 2.4 km || 
|-id=531 bgcolor=#E9E9E9
| 200531 ||  || — || February 16, 2001 || Socorro || LINEAR || — || align=right | 1.7 km || 
|-id=532 bgcolor=#E9E9E9
| 200532 ||  || — || February 17, 2001 || Socorro || LINEAR || — || align=right | 2.8 km || 
|-id=533 bgcolor=#E9E9E9
| 200533 ||  || — || February 19, 2001 || Socorro || LINEAR || — || align=right | 1.8 km || 
|-id=534 bgcolor=#E9E9E9
| 200534 ||  || — || February 19, 2001 || Socorro || LINEAR || — || align=right | 2.7 km || 
|-id=535 bgcolor=#E9E9E9
| 200535 ||  || — || February 19, 2001 || Anderson Mesa || LONEOS || — || align=right | 4.7 km || 
|-id=536 bgcolor=#E9E9E9
| 200536 ||  || — || February 19, 2001 || Haleakala || NEAT || ADE || align=right | 4.3 km || 
|-id=537 bgcolor=#E9E9E9
| 200537 ||  || — || February 17, 2001 || Socorro || LINEAR || KON || align=right | 4.9 km || 
|-id=538 bgcolor=#E9E9E9
| 200538 || 2001 EH || — || March 2, 2001 || Desert Beaver || W. K. Y. Yeung || — || align=right | 2.0 km || 
|-id=539 bgcolor=#E9E9E9
| 200539 ||  || — || March 3, 2001 || Socorro || LINEAR || — || align=right | 2.6 km || 
|-id=540 bgcolor=#E9E9E9
| 200540 ||  || — || March 14, 2001 || Socorro || LINEAR || — || align=right | 2.2 km || 
|-id=541 bgcolor=#E9E9E9
| 200541 || 2001 FX || — || March 17, 2001 || Socorro || LINEAR || ADE || align=right | 4.4 km || 
|-id=542 bgcolor=#E9E9E9
| 200542 ||  || — || March 18, 2001 || Socorro || LINEAR || MIS || align=right | 3.5 km || 
|-id=543 bgcolor=#E9E9E9
| 200543 ||  || — || March 19, 2001 || Socorro || LINEAR || — || align=right | 1.6 km || 
|-id=544 bgcolor=#C2FFFF
| 200544 ||  || — || March 27, 2001 || Kitt Peak || Spacewatch || L4 || align=right | 9.4 km || 
|-id=545 bgcolor=#E9E9E9
| 200545 ||  || — || March 21, 2001 || Anderson Mesa || LONEOS || — || align=right | 1.9 km || 
|-id=546 bgcolor=#E9E9E9
| 200546 ||  || — || March 21, 2001 || Haleakala || NEAT || — || align=right | 2.9 km || 
|-id=547 bgcolor=#E9E9E9
| 200547 ||  || — || March 24, 2001 || Socorro || LINEAR || — || align=right | 1.6 km || 
|-id=548 bgcolor=#E9E9E9
| 200548 ||  || — || March 26, 2001 || Socorro || LINEAR || GEF || align=right | 2.5 km || 
|-id=549 bgcolor=#E9E9E9
| 200549 ||  || — || March 26, 2001 || Haleakala || NEAT || — || align=right | 2.2 km || 
|-id=550 bgcolor=#E9E9E9
| 200550 ||  || — || March 18, 2001 || Anderson Mesa || LONEOS || — || align=right | 2.1 km || 
|-id=551 bgcolor=#E9E9E9
| 200551 ||  || — || March 17, 2001 || Socorro || LINEAR || — || align=right | 1.7 km || 
|-id=552 bgcolor=#E9E9E9
| 200552 ||  || — || April 18, 2001 || Socorro || LINEAR || — || align=right | 3.1 km || 
|-id=553 bgcolor=#E9E9E9
| 200553 ||  || — || April 17, 2001 || Anderson Mesa || LONEOS || — || align=right | 4.1 km || 
|-id=554 bgcolor=#E9E9E9
| 200554 ||  || — || May 16, 2001 || Palomar || NEAT || — || align=right | 1.9 km || 
|-id=555 bgcolor=#fefefe
| 200555 ||  || — || May 21, 2001 || Socorro || LINEAR || — || align=right | 1.3 km || 
|-id=556 bgcolor=#d6d6d6
| 200556 ||  || — || May 25, 2001 || Ondřejov || P. Kušnirák, P. Pravec || — || align=right | 4.5 km || 
|-id=557 bgcolor=#E9E9E9
| 200557 ||  || — || May 24, 2001 || Reedy Creek || J. Broughton || — || align=right | 2.5 km || 
|-id=558 bgcolor=#d6d6d6
| 200558 ||  || — || May 22, 2001 || Socorro || LINEAR || — || align=right | 7.2 km || 
|-id=559 bgcolor=#fefefe
| 200559 ||  || — || June 18, 2001 || Palomar || NEAT || FLO || align=right data-sort-value="0.79" | 790 m || 
|-id=560 bgcolor=#d6d6d6
| 200560 ||  || — || July 17, 2001 || Anderson Mesa || LONEOS || ALA || align=right | 10 km || 
|-id=561 bgcolor=#fefefe
| 200561 ||  || — || July 21, 2001 || Palomar || NEAT || — || align=right | 1.3 km || 
|-id=562 bgcolor=#fefefe
| 200562 ||  || — || July 21, 2001 || Anderson Mesa || LONEOS || — || align=right | 2.8 km || 
|-id=563 bgcolor=#d6d6d6
| 200563 ||  || — || July 18, 2001 || Palomar || NEAT || — || align=right | 6.0 km || 
|-id=564 bgcolor=#fefefe
| 200564 ||  || — || July 20, 2001 || Palomar || NEAT || — || align=right | 1.4 km || 
|-id=565 bgcolor=#d6d6d6
| 200565 ||  || — || July 26, 2001 || Palomar || NEAT || — || align=right | 3.9 km || 
|-id=566 bgcolor=#fefefe
| 200566 ||  || — || July 27, 2001 || Reedy Creek || J. Broughton || FLO || align=right data-sort-value="0.92" | 920 m || 
|-id=567 bgcolor=#fefefe
| 200567 ||  || — || July 21, 2001 || Anderson Mesa || LONEOS || — || align=right | 1.7 km || 
|-id=568 bgcolor=#d6d6d6
| 200568 ||  || — || July 22, 2001 || Palomar || NEAT || — || align=right | 5.4 km || 
|-id=569 bgcolor=#fefefe
| 200569 ||  || — || August 10, 2001 || Palomar || NEAT || FLO || align=right data-sort-value="0.88" | 880 m || 
|-id=570 bgcolor=#fefefe
| 200570 ||  || — || August 10, 2001 || Palomar || NEAT || — || align=right | 1.3 km || 
|-id=571 bgcolor=#fefefe
| 200571 ||  || — || August 10, 2001 || Haleakala || NEAT || — || align=right | 1.1 km || 
|-id=572 bgcolor=#fefefe
| 200572 ||  || — || August 11, 2001 || Haleakala || NEAT || FLO || align=right data-sort-value="0.77" | 770 m || 
|-id=573 bgcolor=#fefefe
| 200573 ||  || — || August 10, 2001 || Palomar || NEAT || — || align=right | 1.1 km || 
|-id=574 bgcolor=#fefefe
| 200574 ||  || — || August 10, 2001 || Palomar || NEAT || — || align=right | 1.0 km || 
|-id=575 bgcolor=#fefefe
| 200575 ||  || — || August 16, 2001 || Socorro || LINEAR || FLO || align=right | 1.00 km || 
|-id=576 bgcolor=#fefefe
| 200576 ||  || — || August 16, 2001 || Socorro || LINEAR || — || align=right | 1.5 km || 
|-id=577 bgcolor=#fefefe
| 200577 ||  || — || August 16, 2001 || Socorro || LINEAR || FLO || align=right data-sort-value="0.94" | 940 m || 
|-id=578 bgcolor=#fefefe
| 200578 Yungchuen ||  ||  || August 23, 2001 || Desert Eagle || W. K. Y. Yeung || — || align=right data-sort-value="0.80" | 800 m || 
|-id=579 bgcolor=#fefefe
| 200579 ||  || — || August 23, 2001 || Socorro || LINEAR || — || align=right | 1.1 km || 
|-id=580 bgcolor=#fefefe
| 200580 ||  || — || August 23, 2001 || Socorro || LINEAR || PHO || align=right | 1.5 km || 
|-id=581 bgcolor=#fefefe
| 200581 ||  || — || August 22, 2001 || Socorro || LINEAR || — || align=right | 1.6 km || 
|-id=582 bgcolor=#fefefe
| 200582 ||  || — || August 23, 2001 || Anderson Mesa || LONEOS || — || align=right data-sort-value="0.82" | 820 m || 
|-id=583 bgcolor=#fefefe
| 200583 ||  || — || August 23, 2001 || Anderson Mesa || LONEOS || — || align=right | 1.3 km || 
|-id=584 bgcolor=#fefefe
| 200584 ||  || — || August 31, 2001 || Desert Eagle || W. K. Y. Yeung || FLO || align=right | 1.2 km || 
|-id=585 bgcolor=#d6d6d6
| 200585 ||  || — || August 22, 2001 || Socorro || LINEAR || — || align=right | 6.0 km || 
|-id=586 bgcolor=#fefefe
| 200586 ||  || — || August 23, 2001 || Anderson Mesa || LONEOS || — || align=right data-sort-value="0.92" | 920 m || 
|-id=587 bgcolor=#fefefe
| 200587 ||  || — || August 23, 2001 || Anderson Mesa || LONEOS || FLO || align=right data-sort-value="0.76" | 760 m || 
|-id=588 bgcolor=#fefefe
| 200588 ||  || — || August 26, 2001 || Socorro || LINEAR || PHO || align=right | 1.7 km || 
|-id=589 bgcolor=#FA8072
| 200589 ||  || — || September 8, 2001 || Socorro || LINEAR || — || align=right data-sort-value="0.70" | 700 m || 
|-id=590 bgcolor=#fefefe
| 200590 ||  || — || September 8, 2001 || Socorro || LINEAR || FLO || align=right data-sort-value="0.78" | 780 m || 
|-id=591 bgcolor=#fefefe
| 200591 ||  || — || September 7, 2001 || Socorro || LINEAR || — || align=right | 1.0 km || 
|-id=592 bgcolor=#fefefe
| 200592 ||  || — || September 7, 2001 || Socorro || LINEAR || — || align=right | 1.0 km || 
|-id=593 bgcolor=#fefefe
| 200593 ||  || — || September 12, 2001 || Socorro || LINEAR || — || align=right | 2.2 km || 
|-id=594 bgcolor=#fefefe
| 200594 ||  || — || September 10, 2001 || Socorro || LINEAR || FLO || align=right | 1.2 km || 
|-id=595 bgcolor=#fefefe
| 200595 ||  || — || September 10, 2001 || Socorro || LINEAR || — || align=right | 1.0 km || 
|-id=596 bgcolor=#fefefe
| 200596 ||  || — || September 10, 2001 || Socorro || LINEAR || — || align=right | 1.8 km || 
|-id=597 bgcolor=#FA8072
| 200597 ||  || — || September 10, 2001 || Socorro || LINEAR || — || align=right | 1.6 km || 
|-id=598 bgcolor=#fefefe
| 200598 ||  || — || September 11, 2001 || Anderson Mesa || LONEOS || — || align=right | 1.3 km || 
|-id=599 bgcolor=#fefefe
| 200599 ||  || — || September 11, 2001 || Anderson Mesa || LONEOS || — || align=right | 1.4 km || 
|-id=600 bgcolor=#fefefe
| 200600 ||  || — || September 12, 2001 || Socorro || LINEAR || — || align=right | 1.1 km || 
|}

200601–200700 

|-bgcolor=#fefefe
| 200601 ||  || — || September 12, 2001 || Socorro || LINEAR || — || align=right data-sort-value="0.87" | 870 m || 
|-id=602 bgcolor=#d6d6d6
| 200602 ||  || — || September 12, 2001 || Socorro || LINEAR || — || align=right | 5.6 km || 
|-id=603 bgcolor=#fefefe
| 200603 ||  || — || September 12, 2001 || Socorro || LINEAR || — || align=right | 1.0 km || 
|-id=604 bgcolor=#fefefe
| 200604 ||  || — || September 12, 2001 || Socorro || LINEAR || — || align=right | 1.2 km || 
|-id=605 bgcolor=#fefefe
| 200605 ||  || — || September 12, 2001 || Socorro || LINEAR || — || align=right | 1.2 km || 
|-id=606 bgcolor=#fefefe
| 200606 ||  || — || September 12, 2001 || Socorro || LINEAR || PHO || align=right | 2.4 km || 
|-id=607 bgcolor=#FA8072
| 200607 ||  || — || September 7, 2001 || Anderson Mesa || LONEOS || — || align=right | 1.2 km || 
|-id=608 bgcolor=#fefefe
| 200608 ||  || — || September 10, 2001 || Anderson Mesa || LONEOS || — || align=right | 1.1 km || 
|-id=609 bgcolor=#fefefe
| 200609 ||  || — || September 11, 2001 || Anderson Mesa || LONEOS || V || align=right data-sort-value="0.79" | 790 m || 
|-id=610 bgcolor=#fefefe
| 200610 ||  || — || September 12, 2001 || Palomar || NEAT || — || align=right | 1.5 km || 
|-id=611 bgcolor=#d6d6d6
| 200611 ||  || — || September 16, 2001 || Socorro || LINEAR || HYG || align=right | 4.3 km || 
|-id=612 bgcolor=#fefefe
| 200612 ||  || — || September 16, 2001 || Socorro || LINEAR || — || align=right data-sort-value="0.98" | 980 m || 
|-id=613 bgcolor=#d6d6d6
| 200613 ||  || — || September 16, 2001 || Socorro || LINEAR || — || align=right | 5.2 km || 
|-id=614 bgcolor=#fefefe
| 200614 ||  || — || September 16, 2001 || Socorro || LINEAR || FLO || align=right | 1.0 km || 
|-id=615 bgcolor=#fefefe
| 200615 ||  || — || September 16, 2001 || Socorro || LINEAR || FLO || align=right data-sort-value="0.79" | 790 m || 
|-id=616 bgcolor=#fefefe
| 200616 ||  || — || September 16, 2001 || Socorro || LINEAR || — || align=right data-sort-value="0.98" | 980 m || 
|-id=617 bgcolor=#fefefe
| 200617 ||  || — || September 16, 2001 || Socorro || LINEAR || FLO || align=right | 1.2 km || 
|-id=618 bgcolor=#fefefe
| 200618 ||  || — || September 17, 2001 || Socorro || LINEAR || — || align=right data-sort-value="0.98" | 980 m || 
|-id=619 bgcolor=#fefefe
| 200619 ||  || — || September 20, 2001 || Desert Eagle || W. K. Y. Yeung || NYS || align=right data-sort-value="0.88" | 880 m || 
|-id=620 bgcolor=#d6d6d6
| 200620 ||  || — || September 20, 2001 || Socorro || LINEAR || — || align=right | 5.1 km || 
|-id=621 bgcolor=#fefefe
| 200621 ||  || — || September 20, 2001 || Socorro || LINEAR || — || align=right | 1.0 km || 
|-id=622 bgcolor=#fefefe
| 200622 ||  || — || September 20, 2001 || Socorro || LINEAR || FLO || align=right data-sort-value="0.88" | 880 m || 
|-id=623 bgcolor=#fefefe
| 200623 ||  || — || September 20, 2001 || Socorro || LINEAR || FLO || align=right data-sort-value="0.74" | 740 m || 
|-id=624 bgcolor=#fefefe
| 200624 ||  || — || September 20, 2001 || Socorro || LINEAR || — || align=right data-sort-value="0.80" | 800 m || 
|-id=625 bgcolor=#fefefe
| 200625 ||  || — || September 20, 2001 || Desert Eagle || W. K. Y. Yeung || FLO || align=right data-sort-value="0.75" | 750 m || 
|-id=626 bgcolor=#d6d6d6
| 200626 ||  || — || September 16, 2001 || Socorro || LINEAR || — || align=right | 6.4 km || 
|-id=627 bgcolor=#fefefe
| 200627 ||  || — || September 16, 2001 || Socorro || LINEAR || FLO || align=right data-sort-value="0.85" | 850 m || 
|-id=628 bgcolor=#fefefe
| 200628 ||  || — || September 16, 2001 || Socorro || LINEAR || NYS || align=right data-sort-value="0.93" | 930 m || 
|-id=629 bgcolor=#fefefe
| 200629 ||  || — || September 17, 2001 || Socorro || LINEAR || — || align=right | 1.4 km || 
|-id=630 bgcolor=#fefefe
| 200630 ||  || — || September 17, 2001 || Socorro || LINEAR || FLO || align=right | 1.3 km || 
|-id=631 bgcolor=#fefefe
| 200631 ||  || — || September 19, 2001 || Socorro || LINEAR || — || align=right | 1.3 km || 
|-id=632 bgcolor=#fefefe
| 200632 ||  || — || September 17, 2001 || Socorro || LINEAR || — || align=right | 1.5 km || 
|-id=633 bgcolor=#fefefe
| 200633 ||  || — || September 19, 2001 || Socorro || LINEAR || — || align=right data-sort-value="0.75" | 750 m || 
|-id=634 bgcolor=#fefefe
| 200634 ||  || — || September 19, 2001 || Socorro || LINEAR || — || align=right | 2.6 km || 
|-id=635 bgcolor=#fefefe
| 200635 ||  || — || September 19, 2001 || Socorro || LINEAR || — || align=right data-sort-value="0.97" | 970 m || 
|-id=636 bgcolor=#fefefe
| 200636 ||  || — || September 19, 2001 || Socorro || LINEAR || NYS || align=right data-sort-value="0.77" | 770 m || 
|-id=637 bgcolor=#fefefe
| 200637 ||  || — || September 19, 2001 || Socorro || LINEAR || — || align=right | 1.3 km || 
|-id=638 bgcolor=#fefefe
| 200638 ||  || — || September 19, 2001 || Socorro || LINEAR || — || align=right data-sort-value="0.88" | 880 m || 
|-id=639 bgcolor=#fefefe
| 200639 ||  || — || September 19, 2001 || Socorro || LINEAR || — || align=right data-sort-value="0.87" | 870 m || 
|-id=640 bgcolor=#fefefe
| 200640 ||  || — || September 19, 2001 || Socorro || LINEAR || — || align=right data-sort-value="0.89" | 890 m || 
|-id=641 bgcolor=#fefefe
| 200641 ||  || — || September 19, 2001 || Socorro || LINEAR || FLO || align=right data-sort-value="0.98" | 980 m || 
|-id=642 bgcolor=#fefefe
| 200642 ||  || — || September 20, 2001 || Socorro || LINEAR || — || align=right | 1.4 km || 
|-id=643 bgcolor=#fefefe
| 200643 ||  || — || September 27, 2001 || Socorro || LINEAR || — || align=right | 1.8 km || 
|-id=644 bgcolor=#fefefe
| 200644 ||  || — || September 20, 2001 || Socorro || LINEAR || — || align=right | 1.0 km || 
|-id=645 bgcolor=#fefefe
| 200645 ||  || — || September 21, 2001 || Socorro || LINEAR || FLO || align=right data-sort-value="0.82" | 820 m || 
|-id=646 bgcolor=#fefefe
| 200646 ||  || — || September 19, 2001 || Socorro || LINEAR || — || align=right data-sort-value="0.80" | 800 m || 
|-id=647 bgcolor=#fefefe
| 200647 ||  || — || September 18, 2001 || Anderson Mesa || LONEOS || — || align=right | 1.0 km || 
|-id=648 bgcolor=#FA8072
| 200648 ||  || — || October 6, 2001 || Socorro || LINEAR || — || align=right | 1.00 km || 
|-id=649 bgcolor=#fefefe
| 200649 ||  || — || October 6, 2001 || Palomar || NEAT || — || align=right data-sort-value="0.87" | 870 m || 
|-id=650 bgcolor=#fefefe
| 200650 ||  || — || October 6, 2001 || Palomar || NEAT || — || align=right | 1.1 km || 
|-id=651 bgcolor=#fefefe
| 200651 ||  || — || October 8, 2001 || Palomar || NEAT || — || align=right data-sort-value="0.81" | 810 m || 
|-id=652 bgcolor=#fefefe
| 200652 ||  || — || October 13, 2001 || Socorro || LINEAR || V || align=right data-sort-value="0.85" | 850 m || 
|-id=653 bgcolor=#fefefe
| 200653 ||  || — || October 7, 2001 || Palomar || NEAT || V || align=right | 1.0 km || 
|-id=654 bgcolor=#fefefe
| 200654 ||  || — || October 14, 2001 || Goodricke-Pigott || R. A. Tucker || — || align=right | 1.3 km || 
|-id=655 bgcolor=#fefefe
| 200655 ||  || — || October 11, 2001 || Socorro || LINEAR || — || align=right | 1.4 km || 
|-id=656 bgcolor=#fefefe
| 200656 ||  || — || October 14, 2001 || Socorro || LINEAR || — || align=right | 1.2 km || 
|-id=657 bgcolor=#fefefe
| 200657 ||  || — || October 14, 2001 || Socorro || LINEAR || — || align=right | 1.3 km || 
|-id=658 bgcolor=#fefefe
| 200658 ||  || — || October 14, 2001 || Socorro || LINEAR || PHO || align=right | 1.9 km || 
|-id=659 bgcolor=#fefefe
| 200659 ||  || — || October 14, 2001 || Socorro || LINEAR || — || align=right | 1.3 km || 
|-id=660 bgcolor=#fefefe
| 200660 ||  || — || October 14, 2001 || Desert Eagle || W. K. Y. Yeung || FLO || align=right | 1.0 km || 
|-id=661 bgcolor=#fefefe
| 200661 ||  || — || October 14, 2001 || Desert Eagle || W. K. Y. Yeung || — || align=right | 1.5 km || 
|-id=662 bgcolor=#fefefe
| 200662 ||  || — || October 13, 2001 || Socorro || LINEAR || — || align=right | 1.0 km || 
|-id=663 bgcolor=#fefefe
| 200663 ||  || — || October 13, 2001 || Socorro || LINEAR || — || align=right | 1.1 km || 
|-id=664 bgcolor=#fefefe
| 200664 ||  || — || October 14, 2001 || Socorro || LINEAR || — || align=right | 1.00 km || 
|-id=665 bgcolor=#fefefe
| 200665 ||  || — || October 14, 2001 || Socorro || LINEAR || FLO || align=right data-sort-value="0.92" | 920 m || 
|-id=666 bgcolor=#fefefe
| 200666 ||  || — || October 14, 2001 || Socorro || LINEAR || — || align=right | 1.0 km || 
|-id=667 bgcolor=#fefefe
| 200667 ||  || — || October 14, 2001 || Socorro || LINEAR || — || align=right | 3.1 km || 
|-id=668 bgcolor=#fefefe
| 200668 ||  || — || October 14, 2001 || Socorro || LINEAR || FLO || align=right | 1.3 km || 
|-id=669 bgcolor=#fefefe
| 200669 ||  || — || October 14, 2001 || Socorro || LINEAR || FLO || align=right | 1.2 km || 
|-id=670 bgcolor=#fefefe
| 200670 ||  || — || October 12, 2001 || Haleakala || NEAT || — || align=right | 1.4 km || 
|-id=671 bgcolor=#fefefe
| 200671 ||  || — || October 13, 2001 || Kitt Peak || Spacewatch || V || align=right data-sort-value="0.88" | 880 m || 
|-id=672 bgcolor=#fefefe
| 200672 ||  || — || October 11, 2001 || Palomar || NEAT || FLO || align=right data-sort-value="0.72" | 720 m || 
|-id=673 bgcolor=#fefefe
| 200673 ||  || — || October 11, 2001 || Palomar || NEAT || FLO || align=right data-sort-value="0.81" | 810 m || 
|-id=674 bgcolor=#fefefe
| 200674 ||  || — || October 10, 2001 || Palomar || NEAT || V || align=right data-sort-value="0.78" | 780 m || 
|-id=675 bgcolor=#fefefe
| 200675 ||  || — || October 15, 2001 || Palomar || NEAT || FLO || align=right data-sort-value="0.76" | 760 m || 
|-id=676 bgcolor=#fefefe
| 200676 ||  || — || October 11, 2001 || Palomar || NEAT || — || align=right | 1.3 km || 
|-id=677 bgcolor=#fefefe
| 200677 ||  || — || October 13, 2001 || Socorro || LINEAR || — || align=right data-sort-value="0.94" | 940 m || 
|-id=678 bgcolor=#d6d6d6
| 200678 ||  || — || October 14, 2001 || Socorro || LINEAR || — || align=right | 4.2 km || 
|-id=679 bgcolor=#fefefe
| 200679 ||  || — || October 14, 2001 || Socorro || LINEAR || V || align=right | 1.1 km || 
|-id=680 bgcolor=#fefefe
| 200680 ||  || — || October 14, 2001 || Socorro || LINEAR || — || align=right | 1.2 km || 
|-id=681 bgcolor=#fefefe
| 200681 ||  || — || October 14, 2001 || Socorro || LINEAR || FLO || align=right | 1.1 km || 
|-id=682 bgcolor=#fefefe
| 200682 ||  || — || October 14, 2001 || Socorro || LINEAR || — || align=right | 1.2 km || 
|-id=683 bgcolor=#fefefe
| 200683 ||  || — || October 11, 2001 || Socorro || LINEAR || FLO || align=right data-sort-value="0.92" | 920 m || 
|-id=684 bgcolor=#d6d6d6
| 200684 ||  || — || October 13, 2001 || Palomar || NEAT || EOS || align=right | 3.8 km || 
|-id=685 bgcolor=#d6d6d6
| 200685 ||  || — || October 14, 2001 || Anderson Mesa || LONEOS || 7:4 || align=right | 5.5 km || 
|-id=686 bgcolor=#fefefe
| 200686 ||  || — || October 15, 2001 || Socorro || LINEAR || — || align=right | 1.5 km || 
|-id=687 bgcolor=#fefefe
| 200687 ||  || — || October 15, 2001 || Kitt Peak || Spacewatch || FLO || align=right data-sort-value="0.80" | 800 m || 
|-id=688 bgcolor=#fefefe
| 200688 ||  || — || October 19, 2001 || Nacogdoches || SFA Obs. || — || align=right data-sort-value="0.99" | 990 m || 
|-id=689 bgcolor=#FA8072
| 200689 ||  || — || October 17, 2001 || Socorro || LINEAR || — || align=right | 1.2 km || 
|-id=690 bgcolor=#fefefe
| 200690 ||  || — || October 17, 2001 || Socorro || LINEAR || V || align=right | 1.0 km || 
|-id=691 bgcolor=#fefefe
| 200691 ||  || — || October 18, 2001 || Socorro || LINEAR || V || align=right data-sort-value="0.99" | 990 m || 
|-id=692 bgcolor=#fefefe
| 200692 ||  || — || October 16, 2001 || Socorro || LINEAR || NYS || align=right data-sort-value="0.98" | 980 m || 
|-id=693 bgcolor=#fefefe
| 200693 ||  || — || October 17, 2001 || Socorro || LINEAR || FLO || align=right data-sort-value="0.85" | 850 m || 
|-id=694 bgcolor=#fefefe
| 200694 ||  || — || October 17, 2001 || Socorro || LINEAR || — || align=right | 1.2 km || 
|-id=695 bgcolor=#fefefe
| 200695 ||  || — || October 17, 2001 || Socorro || LINEAR || — || align=right | 1.1 km || 
|-id=696 bgcolor=#fefefe
| 200696 ||  || — || October 17, 2001 || Socorro || LINEAR || — || align=right data-sort-value="0.92" | 920 m || 
|-id=697 bgcolor=#fefefe
| 200697 ||  || — || October 17, 2001 || Kitt Peak || Spacewatch || NYS || align=right data-sort-value="0.87" | 870 m || 
|-id=698 bgcolor=#fefefe
| 200698 ||  || — || October 17, 2001 || Kitt Peak || Spacewatch || — || align=right data-sort-value="0.79" | 790 m || 
|-id=699 bgcolor=#fefefe
| 200699 ||  || — || October 17, 2001 || Socorro || LINEAR || — || align=right | 1.3 km || 
|-id=700 bgcolor=#fefefe
| 200700 ||  || — || October 20, 2001 || Socorro || LINEAR || — || align=right | 1.1 km || 
|}

200701–200800 

|-bgcolor=#FA8072
| 200701 ||  || — || October 20, 2001 || Socorro || LINEAR || — || align=right | 1.2 km || 
|-id=702 bgcolor=#fefefe
| 200702 ||  || — || October 20, 2001 || Socorro || LINEAR || NYS || align=right data-sort-value="0.80" | 800 m || 
|-id=703 bgcolor=#fefefe
| 200703 ||  || — || October 19, 2001 || Haleakala || NEAT || V || align=right | 1.0 km || 
|-id=704 bgcolor=#fefefe
| 200704 ||  || — || October 22, 2001 || Socorro || LINEAR || — || align=right | 1.2 km || 
|-id=705 bgcolor=#fefefe
| 200705 ||  || — || October 20, 2001 || Socorro || LINEAR || V || align=right data-sort-value="0.91" | 910 m || 
|-id=706 bgcolor=#fefefe
| 200706 ||  || — || October 23, 2001 || Socorro || LINEAR || — || align=right data-sort-value="0.72" | 720 m || 
|-id=707 bgcolor=#fefefe
| 200707 ||  || — || October 23, 2001 || Socorro || LINEAR || — || align=right data-sort-value="0.85" | 850 m || 
|-id=708 bgcolor=#fefefe
| 200708 ||  || — || October 23, 2001 || Socorro || LINEAR || — || align=right data-sort-value="0.93" | 930 m || 
|-id=709 bgcolor=#fefefe
| 200709 ||  || — || October 23, 2001 || Socorro || LINEAR || FLO || align=right data-sort-value="0.91" | 910 m || 
|-id=710 bgcolor=#fefefe
| 200710 ||  || — || October 23, 2001 || Socorro || LINEAR || — || align=right | 1.7 km || 
|-id=711 bgcolor=#fefefe
| 200711 ||  || — || October 23, 2001 || Socorro || LINEAR || FLO || align=right | 1.2 km || 
|-id=712 bgcolor=#fefefe
| 200712 ||  || — || October 23, 2001 || Socorro || LINEAR || — || align=right | 1.3 km || 
|-id=713 bgcolor=#fefefe
| 200713 ||  || — || October 23, 2001 || Socorro || LINEAR || NYS || align=right | 1.2 km || 
|-id=714 bgcolor=#fefefe
| 200714 ||  || — || October 23, 2001 || Palomar || NEAT || FLO || align=right | 1.1 km || 
|-id=715 bgcolor=#fefefe
| 200715 ||  || — || October 18, 2001 || Palomar || NEAT || — || align=right | 1.0 km || 
|-id=716 bgcolor=#fefefe
| 200716 ||  || — || October 18, 2001 || Palomar || NEAT || FLO || align=right | 1.7 km || 
|-id=717 bgcolor=#fefefe
| 200717 ||  || — || October 20, 2001 || Socorro || LINEAR || — || align=right | 2.7 km || 
|-id=718 bgcolor=#fefefe
| 200718 ||  || — || October 16, 2001 || Socorro || LINEAR || — || align=right data-sort-value="0.99" | 990 m || 
|-id=719 bgcolor=#fefefe
| 200719 ||  || — || October 21, 2001 || Socorro || LINEAR || — || align=right | 1.1 km || 
|-id=720 bgcolor=#fefefe
| 200720 ||  || — || October 24, 2001 || Socorro || LINEAR || — || align=right | 1.0 km || 
|-id=721 bgcolor=#fefefe
| 200721 ||  || — || November 11, 2001 || Socorro || LINEAR || PHO || align=right | 2.3 km || 
|-id=722 bgcolor=#fefefe
| 200722 ||  || — || November 9, 2001 || Socorro || LINEAR || — || align=right | 1.2 km || 
|-id=723 bgcolor=#fefefe
| 200723 ||  || — || November 9, 2001 || Socorro || LINEAR || — || align=right data-sort-value="0.83" | 830 m || 
|-id=724 bgcolor=#fefefe
| 200724 ||  || — || November 9, 2001 || Socorro || LINEAR || NYS || align=right | 2.2 km || 
|-id=725 bgcolor=#fefefe
| 200725 ||  || — || November 9, 2001 || Socorro || LINEAR || — || align=right | 1.4 km || 
|-id=726 bgcolor=#fefefe
| 200726 ||  || — || November 9, 2001 || Socorro || LINEAR || — || align=right | 1.1 km || 
|-id=727 bgcolor=#fefefe
| 200727 ||  || — || November 9, 2001 || Socorro || LINEAR || — || align=right | 1.4 km || 
|-id=728 bgcolor=#fefefe
| 200728 ||  || — || November 9, 2001 || Socorro || LINEAR || KLI || align=right | 2.8 km || 
|-id=729 bgcolor=#fefefe
| 200729 ||  || — || November 10, 2001 || Socorro || LINEAR || — || align=right | 1.0 km || 
|-id=730 bgcolor=#fefefe
| 200730 ||  || — || November 10, 2001 || Socorro || LINEAR || — || align=right | 1.2 km || 
|-id=731 bgcolor=#fefefe
| 200731 ||  || — || November 10, 2001 || Socorro || LINEAR || FLO || align=right | 1.0 km || 
|-id=732 bgcolor=#fefefe
| 200732 ||  || — || November 10, 2001 || Socorro || LINEAR || — || align=right | 1.2 km || 
|-id=733 bgcolor=#fefefe
| 200733 ||  || — || November 10, 2001 || Socorro || LINEAR || V || align=right data-sort-value="0.95" | 950 m || 
|-id=734 bgcolor=#fefefe
| 200734 ||  || — || November 10, 2001 || Socorro || LINEAR || FLO || align=right | 1.0 km || 
|-id=735 bgcolor=#fefefe
| 200735 ||  || — || November 10, 2001 || Socorro || LINEAR || FLO || align=right | 1.1 km || 
|-id=736 bgcolor=#fefefe
| 200736 ||  || — || November 10, 2001 || Socorro || LINEAR || — || align=right | 1.6 km || 
|-id=737 bgcolor=#fefefe
| 200737 ||  || — || November 10, 2001 || Socorro || LINEAR || NYS || align=right data-sort-value="0.95" | 950 m || 
|-id=738 bgcolor=#fefefe
| 200738 ||  || — || November 11, 2001 || Socorro || LINEAR || — || align=right | 1.2 km || 
|-id=739 bgcolor=#fefefe
| 200739 ||  || — || November 12, 2001 || Socorro || LINEAR || — || align=right data-sort-value="0.94" | 940 m || 
|-id=740 bgcolor=#FA8072
| 200740 ||  || — || November 15, 2001 || Socorro || LINEAR || — || align=right | 1.5 km || 
|-id=741 bgcolor=#fefefe
| 200741 ||  || — || November 12, 2001 || Socorro || LINEAR || NYS || align=right | 2.6 km || 
|-id=742 bgcolor=#fefefe
| 200742 ||  || — || November 12, 2001 || Socorro || LINEAR || V || align=right data-sort-value="0.95" | 950 m || 
|-id=743 bgcolor=#fefefe
| 200743 ||  || — || November 12, 2001 || Socorro || LINEAR || FLO || align=right data-sort-value="0.95" | 950 m || 
|-id=744 bgcolor=#fefefe
| 200744 ||  || — || November 12, 2001 || Socorro || LINEAR || — || align=right | 1.1 km || 
|-id=745 bgcolor=#fefefe
| 200745 ||  || — || November 12, 2001 || Socorro || LINEAR || FLO || align=right | 1.1 km || 
|-id=746 bgcolor=#fefefe
| 200746 ||  || — || November 12, 2001 || Socorro || LINEAR || FLO || align=right | 1.2 km || 
|-id=747 bgcolor=#fefefe
| 200747 ||  || — || November 12, 2001 || Socorro || LINEAR || MAS || align=right data-sort-value="0.86" | 860 m || 
|-id=748 bgcolor=#fefefe
| 200748 ||  || — || November 14, 2001 || Kitt Peak || Spacewatch || NYS || align=right data-sort-value="0.96" | 960 m || 
|-id=749 bgcolor=#fefefe
| 200749 ||  || — || November 14, 2001 || Kitt Peak || Spacewatch || — || align=right data-sort-value="0.99" | 990 m || 
|-id=750 bgcolor=#fefefe
| 200750 Rix ||  ||  || November 11, 2001 || Apache Point || SDSS || — || align=right | 1.1 km || 
|-id=751 bgcolor=#fefefe
| 200751 ||  || — || November 17, 2001 || Socorro || LINEAR || — || align=right data-sort-value="0.98" | 980 m || 
|-id=752 bgcolor=#fefefe
| 200752 ||  || — || November 17, 2001 || Socorro || LINEAR || — || align=right | 1.3 km || 
|-id=753 bgcolor=#fefefe
| 200753 ||  || — || November 17, 2001 || Socorro || LINEAR || — || align=right | 1.3 km || 
|-id=754 bgcolor=#FFC2E0
| 200754 ||  || — || November 27, 2001 || Socorro || LINEAR || APOcritical || align=right data-sort-value="0.55" | 550 m || 
|-id=755 bgcolor=#fefefe
| 200755 ||  || — || November 17, 2001 || Socorro || LINEAR || — || align=right | 1.3 km || 
|-id=756 bgcolor=#fefefe
| 200756 ||  || — || November 17, 2001 || Socorro || LINEAR || — || align=right | 1.1 km || 
|-id=757 bgcolor=#fefefe
| 200757 ||  || — || November 17, 2001 || Socorro || LINEAR || V || align=right | 1.3 km || 
|-id=758 bgcolor=#fefefe
| 200758 ||  || — || November 18, 2001 || Socorro || LINEAR || — || align=right | 1.1 km || 
|-id=759 bgcolor=#fefefe
| 200759 ||  || — || November 17, 2001 || Anderson Mesa || LONEOS || PHO || align=right | 2.2 km || 
|-id=760 bgcolor=#fefefe
| 200760 ||  || — || November 20, 2001 || Socorro || LINEAR || — || align=right data-sort-value="0.83" | 830 m || 
|-id=761 bgcolor=#fefefe
| 200761 ||  || — || November 21, 2001 || Socorro || LINEAR || EUT || align=right data-sort-value="0.65" | 650 m || 
|-id=762 bgcolor=#fefefe
| 200762 || 2001 XX || — || December 4, 2001 || Socorro || LINEAR || PHO || align=right | 1.3 km || 
|-id=763 bgcolor=#fefefe
| 200763 ||  || — || December 9, 2001 || Socorro || LINEAR || PHO || align=right | 2.7 km || 
|-id=764 bgcolor=#fefefe
| 200764 ||  || — || December 8, 2001 || Socorro || LINEAR || PHO || align=right | 2.2 km || 
|-id=765 bgcolor=#FA8072
| 200765 ||  || — || December 9, 2001 || Socorro || LINEAR || PHO || align=right | 1.8 km || 
|-id=766 bgcolor=#fefefe
| 200766 ||  || — || December 8, 2001 || Uccle || H. Boffin || — || align=right | 1.8 km || 
|-id=767 bgcolor=#fefefe
| 200767 ||  || — || December 9, 2001 || Socorro || LINEAR || — || align=right | 1.2 km || 
|-id=768 bgcolor=#fefefe
| 200768 ||  || — || December 10, 2001 || Socorro || LINEAR || — || align=right | 1.5 km || 
|-id=769 bgcolor=#fefefe
| 200769 ||  || — || December 10, 2001 || Socorro || LINEAR || — || align=right | 1.6 km || 
|-id=770 bgcolor=#fefefe
| 200770 ||  || — || December 9, 2001 || Socorro || LINEAR || V || align=right | 1.2 km || 
|-id=771 bgcolor=#fefefe
| 200771 ||  || — || December 9, 2001 || Socorro || LINEAR || FLO || align=right | 1.4 km || 
|-id=772 bgcolor=#fefefe
| 200772 ||  || — || December 9, 2001 || Socorro || LINEAR || V || align=right | 1.2 km || 
|-id=773 bgcolor=#fefefe
| 200773 ||  || — || December 7, 2001 || Kitt Peak || Spacewatch || — || align=right data-sort-value="0.99" | 990 m || 
|-id=774 bgcolor=#fefefe
| 200774 ||  || — || December 9, 2001 || Socorro || LINEAR || V || align=right | 1.2 km || 
|-id=775 bgcolor=#fefefe
| 200775 ||  || — || December 9, 2001 || Socorro || LINEAR || V || align=right | 1.3 km || 
|-id=776 bgcolor=#fefefe
| 200776 ||  || — || December 9, 2001 || Socorro || LINEAR || — || align=right | 1.3 km || 
|-id=777 bgcolor=#fefefe
| 200777 ||  || — || December 9, 2001 || Socorro || LINEAR || V || align=right | 1.1 km || 
|-id=778 bgcolor=#fefefe
| 200778 ||  || — || December 10, 2001 || Socorro || LINEAR || — || align=right | 1.3 km || 
|-id=779 bgcolor=#fefefe
| 200779 ||  || — || December 14, 2001 || Socorro || LINEAR || — || align=right | 1.4 km || 
|-id=780 bgcolor=#fefefe
| 200780 ||  || — || December 10, 2001 || Socorro || LINEAR || NYS || align=right data-sort-value="0.82" | 820 m || 
|-id=781 bgcolor=#fefefe
| 200781 ||  || — || December 10, 2001 || Socorro || LINEAR || — || align=right | 1.3 km || 
|-id=782 bgcolor=#fefefe
| 200782 ||  || — || December 10, 2001 || Socorro || LINEAR || NYS || align=right data-sort-value="0.92" | 920 m || 
|-id=783 bgcolor=#fefefe
| 200783 ||  || — || December 10, 2001 || Socorro || LINEAR || NYS || align=right | 1.1 km || 
|-id=784 bgcolor=#fefefe
| 200784 ||  || — || December 10, 2001 || Socorro || LINEAR || NYS || align=right | 1.1 km || 
|-id=785 bgcolor=#fefefe
| 200785 ||  || — || December 10, 2001 || Socorro || LINEAR || FLO || align=right | 2.3 km || 
|-id=786 bgcolor=#fefefe
| 200786 ||  || — || December 11, 2001 || Socorro || LINEAR || — || align=right data-sort-value="0.88" | 880 m || 
|-id=787 bgcolor=#fefefe
| 200787 ||  || — || December 11, 2001 || Socorro || LINEAR || — || align=right data-sort-value="0.91" | 910 m || 
|-id=788 bgcolor=#fefefe
| 200788 ||  || — || December 11, 2001 || Socorro || LINEAR || FLO || align=right | 1.2 km || 
|-id=789 bgcolor=#fefefe
| 200789 ||  || — || December 11, 2001 || Socorro || LINEAR || — || align=right | 1.8 km || 
|-id=790 bgcolor=#fefefe
| 200790 ||  || — || December 14, 2001 || Desert Eagle || W. K. Y. Yeung || — || align=right | 1.3 km || 
|-id=791 bgcolor=#fefefe
| 200791 ||  || — || December 10, 2001 || Socorro || LINEAR || NYS || align=right data-sort-value="0.76" | 760 m || 
|-id=792 bgcolor=#fefefe
| 200792 ||  || — || December 10, 2001 || Socorro || LINEAR || — || align=right data-sort-value="0.93" | 930 m || 
|-id=793 bgcolor=#fefefe
| 200793 ||  || — || December 10, 2001 || Socorro || LINEAR || FLO || align=right | 1.1 km || 
|-id=794 bgcolor=#fefefe
| 200794 ||  || — || December 10, 2001 || Socorro || LINEAR || — || align=right | 1.1 km || 
|-id=795 bgcolor=#fefefe
| 200795 ||  || — || December 11, 2001 || Socorro || LINEAR || — || align=right data-sort-value="0.99" | 990 m || 
|-id=796 bgcolor=#fefefe
| 200796 ||  || — || December 15, 2001 || Socorro || LINEAR || — || align=right | 1.4 km || 
|-id=797 bgcolor=#fefefe
| 200797 ||  || — || December 11, 2001 || Socorro || LINEAR || NYS || align=right data-sort-value="0.87" | 870 m || 
|-id=798 bgcolor=#fefefe
| 200798 ||  || — || December 13, 2001 || Socorro || LINEAR || — || align=right | 1.7 km || 
|-id=799 bgcolor=#fefefe
| 200799 ||  || — || December 13, 2001 || Socorro || LINEAR || — || align=right | 1.6 km || 
|-id=800 bgcolor=#fefefe
| 200800 ||  || — || December 14, 2001 || Socorro || LINEAR || NYS || align=right data-sort-value="0.85" | 850 m || 
|}

200801–200900 

|-bgcolor=#fefefe
| 200801 ||  || — || December 14, 2001 || Socorro || LINEAR || NYS || align=right | 1.0 km || 
|-id=802 bgcolor=#fefefe
| 200802 ||  || — || December 14, 2001 || Socorro || LINEAR || — || align=right data-sort-value="0.87" | 870 m || 
|-id=803 bgcolor=#fefefe
| 200803 ||  || — || December 14, 2001 || Socorro || LINEAR || — || align=right | 1.2 km || 
|-id=804 bgcolor=#fefefe
| 200804 ||  || — || December 14, 2001 || Socorro || LINEAR || V || align=right | 1.0 km || 
|-id=805 bgcolor=#fefefe
| 200805 ||  || — || December 14, 2001 || Socorro || LINEAR || NYS || align=right data-sort-value="0.85" | 850 m || 
|-id=806 bgcolor=#fefefe
| 200806 ||  || — || December 14, 2001 || Socorro || LINEAR || — || align=right | 1.1 km || 
|-id=807 bgcolor=#fefefe
| 200807 ||  || — || December 14, 2001 || Socorro || LINEAR || — || align=right | 1.5 km || 
|-id=808 bgcolor=#fefefe
| 200808 ||  || — || December 14, 2001 || Socorro || LINEAR || — || align=right data-sort-value="0.94" | 940 m || 
|-id=809 bgcolor=#fefefe
| 200809 ||  || — || December 14, 2001 || Socorro || LINEAR || NYS || align=right data-sort-value="0.94" | 940 m || 
|-id=810 bgcolor=#fefefe
| 200810 ||  || — || December 14, 2001 || Socorro || LINEAR || V || align=right | 1.1 km || 
|-id=811 bgcolor=#fefefe
| 200811 ||  || — || December 14, 2001 || Socorro || LINEAR || — || align=right | 1.7 km || 
|-id=812 bgcolor=#fefefe
| 200812 ||  || — || December 14, 2001 || Socorro || LINEAR || — || align=right | 1.5 km || 
|-id=813 bgcolor=#fefefe
| 200813 ||  || — || December 14, 2001 || Socorro || LINEAR || — || align=right | 1.1 km || 
|-id=814 bgcolor=#fefefe
| 200814 ||  || — || December 14, 2001 || Socorro || LINEAR || FLO || align=right data-sort-value="0.94" | 940 m || 
|-id=815 bgcolor=#fefefe
| 200815 ||  || — || December 14, 2001 || Socorro || LINEAR || V || align=right | 1.2 km || 
|-id=816 bgcolor=#fefefe
| 200816 ||  || — || December 14, 2001 || Socorro || LINEAR || NYS || align=right data-sort-value="0.72" | 720 m || 
|-id=817 bgcolor=#fefefe
| 200817 ||  || — || December 14, 2001 || Socorro || LINEAR || — || align=right | 1.2 km || 
|-id=818 bgcolor=#fefefe
| 200818 ||  || — || December 14, 2001 || Socorro || LINEAR || V || align=right data-sort-value="0.95" | 950 m || 
|-id=819 bgcolor=#fefefe
| 200819 ||  || — || December 14, 2001 || Socorro || LINEAR || NYS || align=right data-sort-value="0.98" | 980 m || 
|-id=820 bgcolor=#fefefe
| 200820 ||  || — || December 14, 2001 || Socorro || LINEAR || — || align=right | 1.9 km || 
|-id=821 bgcolor=#fefefe
| 200821 ||  || — || December 11, 2001 || Socorro || LINEAR || FLO || align=right | 1.0 km || 
|-id=822 bgcolor=#fefefe
| 200822 ||  || — || December 11, 2001 || Socorro || LINEAR || — || align=right | 1.6 km || 
|-id=823 bgcolor=#fefefe
| 200823 ||  || — || December 11, 2001 || Socorro || LINEAR || — || align=right | 1.1 km || 
|-id=824 bgcolor=#fefefe
| 200824 ||  || — || December 14, 2001 || Socorro || LINEAR || V || align=right | 1.1 km || 
|-id=825 bgcolor=#fefefe
| 200825 ||  || — || December 15, 2001 || Socorro || LINEAR || V || align=right data-sort-value="0.89" | 890 m || 
|-id=826 bgcolor=#fefefe
| 200826 ||  || — || December 15, 2001 || Socorro || LINEAR || V || align=right | 1.0 km || 
|-id=827 bgcolor=#fefefe
| 200827 ||  || — || December 15, 2001 || Socorro || LINEAR || V || align=right | 1.0 km || 
|-id=828 bgcolor=#fefefe
| 200828 ||  || — || December 15, 2001 || Socorro || LINEAR || — || align=right | 1.2 km || 
|-id=829 bgcolor=#fefefe
| 200829 ||  || — || December 15, 2001 || Socorro || LINEAR || V || align=right | 1.1 km || 
|-id=830 bgcolor=#fefefe
| 200830 ||  || — || December 15, 2001 || Socorro || LINEAR || NYS || align=right data-sort-value="0.89" | 890 m || 
|-id=831 bgcolor=#fefefe
| 200831 ||  || — || December 15, 2001 || Socorro || LINEAR || V || align=right | 1.1 km || 
|-id=832 bgcolor=#fefefe
| 200832 ||  || — || December 15, 2001 || Socorro || LINEAR || V || align=right | 1.5 km || 
|-id=833 bgcolor=#fefefe
| 200833 ||  || — || December 15, 2001 || Socorro || LINEAR || V || align=right | 1.3 km || 
|-id=834 bgcolor=#fefefe
| 200834 ||  || — || December 15, 2001 || Socorro || LINEAR || — || align=right | 1.7 km || 
|-id=835 bgcolor=#fefefe
| 200835 ||  || — || December 15, 2001 || Socorro || LINEAR || — || align=right | 1.4 km || 
|-id=836 bgcolor=#fefefe
| 200836 ||  || — || December 15, 2001 || Socorro || LINEAR || — || align=right | 1.6 km || 
|-id=837 bgcolor=#fefefe
| 200837 ||  || — || December 14, 2001 || Socorro || LINEAR || V || align=right | 1.2 km || 
|-id=838 bgcolor=#fefefe
| 200838 ||  || — || December 15, 2001 || Socorro || LINEAR || — || align=right data-sort-value="0.80" | 800 m || 
|-id=839 bgcolor=#fefefe
| 200839 ||  || — || December 15, 2001 || Socorro || LINEAR || NYS || align=right | 1.1 km || 
|-id=840 bgcolor=#FFC2E0
| 200840 ||  || — || December 9, 2001 || Mauna Kea || S. S. Sheppard || AMO +1kmPHA || align=right | 1.1 km || 
|-id=841 bgcolor=#fefefe
| 200841 ||  || — || December 5, 2001 || Haleakala || NEAT || PHO || align=right | 1.7 km || 
|-id=842 bgcolor=#fefefe
| 200842 ||  || — || December 14, 2001 || Socorro || LINEAR || FLO || align=right | 1.1 km || 
|-id=843 bgcolor=#fefefe
| 200843 ||  || — || December 14, 2001 || Socorro || LINEAR || NYS || align=right data-sort-value="0.82" | 820 m || 
|-id=844 bgcolor=#fefefe
| 200844 ||  || — || December 17, 2001 || Socorro || LINEAR || — || align=right | 1.2 km || 
|-id=845 bgcolor=#fefefe
| 200845 ||  || — || December 17, 2001 || Socorro || LINEAR || — || align=right | 1.0 km || 
|-id=846 bgcolor=#fefefe
| 200846 ||  || — || December 17, 2001 || Socorro || LINEAR || — || align=right | 2.3 km || 
|-id=847 bgcolor=#fefefe
| 200847 ||  || — || December 17, 2001 || Socorro || LINEAR || — || align=right | 2.4 km || 
|-id=848 bgcolor=#fefefe
| 200848 ||  || — || December 17, 2001 || Socorro || LINEAR || — || align=right | 1.0 km || 
|-id=849 bgcolor=#fefefe
| 200849 ||  || — || December 17, 2001 || Socorro || LINEAR || — || align=right | 1.2 km || 
|-id=850 bgcolor=#fefefe
| 200850 ||  || — || December 18, 2001 || Socorro || LINEAR || V || align=right | 1.3 km || 
|-id=851 bgcolor=#fefefe
| 200851 ||  || — || December 18, 2001 || Socorro || LINEAR || V || align=right | 1.0 km || 
|-id=852 bgcolor=#fefefe
| 200852 ||  || — || December 18, 2001 || Socorro || LINEAR || — || align=right | 1.1 km || 
|-id=853 bgcolor=#fefefe
| 200853 ||  || — || December 18, 2001 || Socorro || LINEAR || FLO || align=right | 1.1 km || 
|-id=854 bgcolor=#fefefe
| 200854 ||  || — || December 18, 2001 || Socorro || LINEAR || — || align=right | 1.6 km || 
|-id=855 bgcolor=#fefefe
| 200855 ||  || — || December 18, 2001 || Socorro || LINEAR || NYS || align=right data-sort-value="0.88" | 880 m || 
|-id=856 bgcolor=#fefefe
| 200856 ||  || — || December 18, 2001 || Socorro || LINEAR || NYS || align=right data-sort-value="0.86" | 860 m || 
|-id=857 bgcolor=#fefefe
| 200857 ||  || — || December 18, 2001 || Socorro || LINEAR || V || align=right | 1.2 km || 
|-id=858 bgcolor=#fefefe
| 200858 ||  || — || December 18, 2001 || Socorro || LINEAR || V || align=right | 1.2 km || 
|-id=859 bgcolor=#fefefe
| 200859 ||  || — || December 18, 2001 || Socorro || LINEAR || MAS || align=right data-sort-value="0.98" | 980 m || 
|-id=860 bgcolor=#fefefe
| 200860 ||  || — || December 18, 2001 || Socorro || LINEAR || NYS || align=right | 1.0 km || 
|-id=861 bgcolor=#fefefe
| 200861 ||  || — || December 18, 2001 || Socorro || LINEAR || FLO || align=right | 1.1 km || 
|-id=862 bgcolor=#fefefe
| 200862 ||  || — || December 18, 2001 || Socorro || LINEAR || V || align=right data-sort-value="0.98" | 980 m || 
|-id=863 bgcolor=#fefefe
| 200863 ||  || — || December 18, 2001 || Socorro || LINEAR || — || align=right | 1.4 km || 
|-id=864 bgcolor=#fefefe
| 200864 ||  || — || December 18, 2001 || Socorro || LINEAR || V || align=right | 1.1 km || 
|-id=865 bgcolor=#fefefe
| 200865 ||  || — || December 18, 2001 || Socorro || LINEAR || — || align=right | 3.0 km || 
|-id=866 bgcolor=#fefefe
| 200866 ||  || — || December 18, 2001 || Socorro || LINEAR || — || align=right data-sort-value="0.95" | 950 m || 
|-id=867 bgcolor=#fefefe
| 200867 ||  || — || December 18, 2001 || Socorro || LINEAR || — || align=right | 1.6 km || 
|-id=868 bgcolor=#fefefe
| 200868 ||  || — || December 18, 2001 || Socorro || LINEAR || FLO || align=right | 1.9 km || 
|-id=869 bgcolor=#fefefe
| 200869 ||  || — || December 18, 2001 || Socorro || LINEAR || — || align=right | 1.7 km || 
|-id=870 bgcolor=#fefefe
| 200870 ||  || — || December 18, 2001 || Socorro || LINEAR || NYS || align=right | 1.3 km || 
|-id=871 bgcolor=#fefefe
| 200871 ||  || — || December 18, 2001 || Socorro || LINEAR || FLO || align=right | 1.0 km || 
|-id=872 bgcolor=#fefefe
| 200872 ||  || — || December 18, 2001 || Socorro || LINEAR || MAS || align=right | 1.0 km || 
|-id=873 bgcolor=#fefefe
| 200873 ||  || — || December 17, 2001 || Socorro || LINEAR || NYS || align=right | 1.1 km || 
|-id=874 bgcolor=#fefefe
| 200874 ||  || — || December 17, 2001 || Socorro || LINEAR || — || align=right data-sort-value="0.96" | 960 m || 
|-id=875 bgcolor=#fefefe
| 200875 ||  || — || December 17, 2001 || Socorro || LINEAR || V || align=right | 1.2 km || 
|-id=876 bgcolor=#fefefe
| 200876 ||  || — || December 17, 2001 || Socorro || LINEAR || — || align=right | 1.1 km || 
|-id=877 bgcolor=#fefefe
| 200877 ||  || — || December 17, 2001 || Socorro || LINEAR || — || align=right | 1.7 km || 
|-id=878 bgcolor=#fefefe
| 200878 ||  || — || December 18, 2001 || Socorro || LINEAR || — || align=right | 1.4 km || 
|-id=879 bgcolor=#fefefe
| 200879 ||  || — || December 17, 2001 || Socorro || LINEAR || V || align=right | 1.3 km || 
|-id=880 bgcolor=#fefefe
| 200880 ||  || — || December 17, 2001 || Socorro || LINEAR || V || align=right | 1.2 km || 
|-id=881 bgcolor=#fefefe
| 200881 ||  || — || December 17, 2001 || Socorro || LINEAR || V || align=right | 1.2 km || 
|-id=882 bgcolor=#fefefe
| 200882 ||  || — || December 17, 2001 || Socorro || LINEAR || FLO || align=right | 1.2 km || 
|-id=883 bgcolor=#fefefe
| 200883 ||  || — || December 18, 2001 || Socorro || LINEAR || — || align=right | 1.4 km || 
|-id=884 bgcolor=#fefefe
| 200884 ||  || — || December 20, 2001 || Socorro || LINEAR || — || align=right | 1.9 km || 
|-id=885 bgcolor=#fefefe
| 200885 ||  || — || December 18, 2001 || Anderson Mesa || LONEOS || — || align=right | 3.4 km || 
|-id=886 bgcolor=#fefefe
| 200886 ||  || — || January 10, 2002 || Oaxaca || J. M. Roe || NYS || align=right | 1.3 km || 
|-id=887 bgcolor=#fefefe
| 200887 ||  || — || January 10, 2002 || Campo Imperatore || CINEOS || NYS || align=right | 1.0 km || 
|-id=888 bgcolor=#fefefe
| 200888 ||  || — || January 10, 2002 || Campo Imperatore || CINEOS || NYS || align=right data-sort-value="0.65" | 650 m || 
|-id=889 bgcolor=#fefefe
| 200889 ||  || — || January 10, 2002 || Campo Imperatore || CINEOS || NYS || align=right | 1.0 km || 
|-id=890 bgcolor=#fefefe
| 200890 ||  || — || January 8, 2002 || Socorro || LINEAR || — || align=right | 3.2 km || 
|-id=891 bgcolor=#fefefe
| 200891 ||  || — || January 14, 2002 || Socorro || LINEAR || — || align=right | 1.5 km || 
|-id=892 bgcolor=#fefefe
| 200892 ||  || — || January 5, 2002 || Palomar || NEAT || NYS || align=right data-sort-value="0.91" | 910 m || 
|-id=893 bgcolor=#fefefe
| 200893 ||  || — || January 7, 2002 || Anderson Mesa || LONEOS || — || align=right | 1.4 km || 
|-id=894 bgcolor=#fefefe
| 200894 ||  || — || January 10, 2002 || Palomar || NEAT || — || align=right | 1.6 km || 
|-id=895 bgcolor=#fefefe
| 200895 ||  || — || January 9, 2002 || Socorro || LINEAR || — || align=right | 1.6 km || 
|-id=896 bgcolor=#fefefe
| 200896 ||  || — || January 9, 2002 || Socorro || LINEAR || — || align=right | 1.5 km || 
|-id=897 bgcolor=#fefefe
| 200897 ||  || — || January 9, 2002 || Socorro || LINEAR || NYS || align=right data-sort-value="0.74" | 740 m || 
|-id=898 bgcolor=#fefefe
| 200898 ||  || — || January 9, 2002 || Socorro || LINEAR || — || align=right | 2.6 km || 
|-id=899 bgcolor=#fefefe
| 200899 ||  || — || January 9, 2002 || Socorro || LINEAR || — || align=right | 1.3 km || 
|-id=900 bgcolor=#fefefe
| 200900 ||  || — || January 9, 2002 || Socorro || LINEAR || — || align=right | 1.0 km || 
|}

200901–201000 

|-bgcolor=#fefefe
| 200901 ||  || — || January 9, 2002 || Socorro || LINEAR || — || align=right data-sort-value="0.94" | 940 m || 
|-id=902 bgcolor=#d6d6d6
| 200902 ||  || — || January 9, 2002 || Socorro || LINEAR || SHU3:2 || align=right | 6.9 km || 
|-id=903 bgcolor=#fefefe
| 200903 ||  || — || January 9, 2002 || Socorro || LINEAR || NYS || align=right data-sort-value="0.96" | 960 m || 
|-id=904 bgcolor=#fefefe
| 200904 ||  || — || January 9, 2002 || Socorro || LINEAR || — || align=right | 1.2 km || 
|-id=905 bgcolor=#fefefe
| 200905 ||  || — || January 9, 2002 || Socorro || LINEAR || FLO || align=right | 1.0 km || 
|-id=906 bgcolor=#fefefe
| 200906 ||  || — || January 9, 2002 || Socorro || LINEAR || NYS || align=right | 1.1 km || 
|-id=907 bgcolor=#fefefe
| 200907 ||  || — || January 9, 2002 || Socorro || LINEAR || — || align=right | 1.1 km || 
|-id=908 bgcolor=#fefefe
| 200908 ||  || — || January 9, 2002 || Kitt Peak || Spacewatch || MAS || align=right | 1.1 km || 
|-id=909 bgcolor=#fefefe
| 200909 ||  || — || January 8, 2002 || Socorro || LINEAR || NYS || align=right | 1.2 km || 
|-id=910 bgcolor=#fefefe
| 200910 ||  || — || January 8, 2002 || Socorro || LINEAR || NYS || align=right data-sort-value="0.87" | 870 m || 
|-id=911 bgcolor=#fefefe
| 200911 ||  || — || January 8, 2002 || Socorro || LINEAR || V || align=right | 1.2 km || 
|-id=912 bgcolor=#fefefe
| 200912 ||  || — || January 9, 2002 || Socorro || LINEAR || — || align=right | 1.1 km || 
|-id=913 bgcolor=#fefefe
| 200913 ||  || — || January 8, 2002 || Socorro || LINEAR || FLO || align=right data-sort-value="0.91" | 910 m || 
|-id=914 bgcolor=#fefefe
| 200914 ||  || — || January 8, 2002 || Socorro || LINEAR || V || align=right | 1.2 km || 
|-id=915 bgcolor=#fefefe
| 200915 ||  || — || January 8, 2002 || Socorro || LINEAR || — || align=right | 1.3 km || 
|-id=916 bgcolor=#fefefe
| 200916 ||  || — || January 8, 2002 || Socorro || LINEAR || — || align=right | 1.7 km || 
|-id=917 bgcolor=#fefefe
| 200917 ||  || — || January 8, 2002 || Socorro || LINEAR || NYS || align=right | 1.0 km || 
|-id=918 bgcolor=#fefefe
| 200918 ||  || — || January 9, 2002 || Socorro || LINEAR || — || align=right | 1.4 km || 
|-id=919 bgcolor=#fefefe
| 200919 ||  || — || January 9, 2002 || Socorro || LINEAR || — || align=right | 1.6 km || 
|-id=920 bgcolor=#fefefe
| 200920 ||  || — || January 9, 2002 || Socorro || LINEAR || MAS || align=right data-sort-value="0.88" | 880 m || 
|-id=921 bgcolor=#fefefe
| 200921 ||  || — || January 9, 2002 || Socorro || LINEAR || NYS || align=right | 1.1 km || 
|-id=922 bgcolor=#fefefe
| 200922 ||  || — || January 9, 2002 || Socorro || LINEAR || — || align=right | 1.6 km || 
|-id=923 bgcolor=#fefefe
| 200923 ||  || — || January 9, 2002 || Socorro || LINEAR || — || align=right | 1.4 km || 
|-id=924 bgcolor=#fefefe
| 200924 ||  || — || January 9, 2002 || Socorro || LINEAR || MAS || align=right | 1.0 km || 
|-id=925 bgcolor=#fefefe
| 200925 ||  || — || January 9, 2002 || Socorro || LINEAR || V || align=right | 1.2 km || 
|-id=926 bgcolor=#fefefe
| 200926 ||  || — || January 8, 2002 || Socorro || LINEAR || — || align=right | 1.1 km || 
|-id=927 bgcolor=#fefefe
| 200927 ||  || — || January 9, 2002 || Socorro || LINEAR || ERI || align=right | 1.7 km || 
|-id=928 bgcolor=#fefefe
| 200928 ||  || — || January 14, 2002 || Socorro || LINEAR || — || align=right | 1.8 km || 
|-id=929 bgcolor=#fefefe
| 200929 ||  || — || January 13, 2002 || Socorro || LINEAR || NYS || align=right data-sort-value="0.97" | 970 m || 
|-id=930 bgcolor=#fefefe
| 200930 ||  || — || January 13, 2002 || Socorro || LINEAR || — || align=right | 1.1 km || 
|-id=931 bgcolor=#fefefe
| 200931 ||  || — || January 13, 2002 || Socorro || LINEAR || NYS || align=right | 1.00 km || 
|-id=932 bgcolor=#fefefe
| 200932 ||  || — || January 13, 2002 || Socorro || LINEAR || — || align=right | 1.4 km || 
|-id=933 bgcolor=#fefefe
| 200933 ||  || — || January 13, 2002 || Socorro || LINEAR || NYS || align=right | 1.0 km || 
|-id=934 bgcolor=#fefefe
| 200934 ||  || — || January 13, 2002 || Socorro || LINEAR || — || align=right | 2.9 km || 
|-id=935 bgcolor=#fefefe
| 200935 ||  || — || January 13, 2002 || Socorro || LINEAR || — || align=right | 1.2 km || 
|-id=936 bgcolor=#fefefe
| 200936 ||  || — || January 14, 2002 || Socorro || LINEAR || MAS || align=right | 1.1 km || 
|-id=937 bgcolor=#fefefe
| 200937 ||  || — || January 14, 2002 || Socorro || LINEAR || NYS || align=right | 1.1 km || 
|-id=938 bgcolor=#fefefe
| 200938 ||  || — || January 14, 2002 || Socorro || LINEAR || — || align=right | 1.4 km || 
|-id=939 bgcolor=#fefefe
| 200939 ||  || — || January 14, 2002 || Socorro || LINEAR || — || align=right | 1.2 km || 
|-id=940 bgcolor=#fefefe
| 200940 ||  || — || January 14, 2002 || Socorro || LINEAR || MAS || align=right data-sort-value="0.90" | 900 m || 
|-id=941 bgcolor=#fefefe
| 200941 ||  || — || January 14, 2002 || Socorro || LINEAR || NYS || align=right data-sort-value="0.89" | 890 m || 
|-id=942 bgcolor=#fefefe
| 200942 ||  || — || January 14, 2002 || Socorro || LINEAR || — || align=right | 1.3 km || 
|-id=943 bgcolor=#fefefe
| 200943 ||  || — || January 12, 2002 || Kitt Peak || Spacewatch || V || align=right data-sort-value="0.76" | 760 m || 
|-id=944 bgcolor=#fefefe
| 200944 ||  || — || January 8, 2002 || Socorro || LINEAR || — || align=right data-sort-value="0.94" | 940 m || 
|-id=945 bgcolor=#fefefe
| 200945 ||  || — || January 7, 2002 || Kitt Peak || Spacewatch || MAS || align=right data-sort-value="0.75" | 750 m || 
|-id=946 bgcolor=#fefefe
| 200946 ||  || — || January 18, 2002 || Socorro || LINEAR || — || align=right | 1.4 km || 
|-id=947 bgcolor=#E9E9E9
| 200947 ||  || — || January 20, 2002 || Kitt Peak || Spacewatch || — || align=right | 1.3 km || 
|-id=948 bgcolor=#fefefe
| 200948 ||  || — || January 18, 2002 || Socorro || LINEAR || KLI || align=right | 4.0 km || 
|-id=949 bgcolor=#fefefe
| 200949 ||  || — || January 19, 2002 || Socorro || LINEAR || — || align=right | 1.6 km || 
|-id=950 bgcolor=#fefefe
| 200950 ||  || — || January 19, 2002 || Socorro || LINEAR || — || align=right | 1.1 km || 
|-id=951 bgcolor=#fefefe
| 200951 ||  || — || January 19, 2002 || Socorro || LINEAR || — || align=right | 1.6 km || 
|-id=952 bgcolor=#fefefe
| 200952 ||  || — || January 21, 2002 || Socorro || LINEAR || — || align=right | 1.4 km || 
|-id=953 bgcolor=#fefefe
| 200953 ||  || — || January 21, 2002 || Socorro || LINEAR || V || align=right | 1.2 km || 
|-id=954 bgcolor=#fefefe
| 200954 ||  || — || January 21, 2002 || Socorro || LINEAR || — || align=right | 1.5 km || 
|-id=955 bgcolor=#fefefe
| 200955 ||  || — || January 17, 2002 || Palomar || NEAT || V || align=right | 1.1 km || 
|-id=956 bgcolor=#fefefe
| 200956 ||  || — || January 21, 2002 || Socorro || LINEAR || — || align=right data-sort-value="0.97" | 970 m || 
|-id=957 bgcolor=#fefefe
| 200957 ||  || — || February 6, 2002 || Desert Eagle || W. K. Y. Yeung || — || align=right | 1.2 km || 
|-id=958 bgcolor=#E9E9E9
| 200958 ||  || — || February 8, 2002 || Desert Eagle || W. K. Y. Yeung || BRU || align=right | 4.6 km || 
|-id=959 bgcolor=#fefefe
| 200959 ||  || — || February 4, 2002 || Palomar || NEAT || — || align=right | 1.4 km || 
|-id=960 bgcolor=#fefefe
| 200960 ||  || — || February 6, 2002 || Socorro || LINEAR || — || align=right | 1.3 km || 
|-id=961 bgcolor=#fefefe
| 200961 ||  || — || February 6, 2002 || Socorro || LINEAR || V || align=right | 1.2 km || 
|-id=962 bgcolor=#fefefe
| 200962 ||  || — || February 6, 2002 || Socorro || LINEAR || — || align=right | 1.2 km || 
|-id=963 bgcolor=#E9E9E9
| 200963 ||  || — || February 6, 2002 || Socorro || LINEAR || KON || align=right | 3.9 km || 
|-id=964 bgcolor=#fefefe
| 200964 ||  || — || February 7, 2002 || Socorro || LINEAR || NYS || align=right data-sort-value="0.95" | 950 m || 
|-id=965 bgcolor=#fefefe
| 200965 ||  || — || February 3, 2002 || Haleakala || NEAT || MAS || align=right | 1.1 km || 
|-id=966 bgcolor=#fefefe
| 200966 ||  || — || February 6, 2002 || Socorro || LINEAR || — || align=right | 2.1 km || 
|-id=967 bgcolor=#fefefe
| 200967 ||  || — || February 7, 2002 || Socorro || LINEAR || NYS || align=right data-sort-value="0.95" | 950 m || 
|-id=968 bgcolor=#fefefe
| 200968 ||  || — || February 7, 2002 || Socorro || LINEAR || NYS || align=right data-sort-value="0.74" | 740 m || 
|-id=969 bgcolor=#fefefe
| 200969 ||  || — || February 7, 2002 || Socorro || LINEAR || — || align=right | 1.2 km || 
|-id=970 bgcolor=#fefefe
| 200970 ||  || — || February 7, 2002 || Socorro || LINEAR || — || align=right data-sort-value="0.90" | 900 m || 
|-id=971 bgcolor=#fefefe
| 200971 ||  || — || February 7, 2002 || Socorro || LINEAR || NYS || align=right | 2.9 km || 
|-id=972 bgcolor=#fefefe
| 200972 ||  || — || February 7, 2002 || Socorro || LINEAR || — || align=right | 1.8 km || 
|-id=973 bgcolor=#fefefe
| 200973 ||  || — || February 7, 2002 || Socorro || LINEAR || NYS || align=right | 1.0 km || 
|-id=974 bgcolor=#fefefe
| 200974 ||  || — || February 7, 2002 || Socorro || LINEAR || NYS || align=right | 1.2 km || 
|-id=975 bgcolor=#fefefe
| 200975 ||  || — || February 7, 2002 || Socorro || LINEAR || — || align=right | 1.4 km || 
|-id=976 bgcolor=#fefefe
| 200976 ||  || — || February 8, 2002 || Socorro || LINEAR || NYS || align=right | 2.0 km || 
|-id=977 bgcolor=#fefefe
| 200977 ||  || — || February 13, 2002 || Socorro || LINEAR || H || align=right data-sort-value="0.94" | 940 m || 
|-id=978 bgcolor=#fefefe
| 200978 ||  || — || February 7, 2002 || Socorro || LINEAR || FLO || align=right data-sort-value="0.93" | 930 m || 
|-id=979 bgcolor=#fefefe
| 200979 ||  || — || February 7, 2002 || Socorro || LINEAR || NYS || align=right data-sort-value="0.87" | 870 m || 
|-id=980 bgcolor=#fefefe
| 200980 ||  || — || February 7, 2002 || Socorro || LINEAR || — || align=right | 1.2 km || 
|-id=981 bgcolor=#fefefe
| 200981 ||  || — || February 7, 2002 || Socorro || LINEAR || — || align=right | 1.2 km || 
|-id=982 bgcolor=#fefefe
| 200982 ||  || — || February 7, 2002 || Socorro || LINEAR || MAS || align=right data-sort-value="0.90" | 900 m || 
|-id=983 bgcolor=#fefefe
| 200983 ||  || — || February 7, 2002 || Socorro || LINEAR || NYS || align=right | 1.0 km || 
|-id=984 bgcolor=#fefefe
| 200984 ||  || — || February 7, 2002 || Socorro || LINEAR || NYS || align=right data-sort-value="0.86" | 860 m || 
|-id=985 bgcolor=#fefefe
| 200985 ||  || — || February 7, 2002 || Socorro || LINEAR || — || align=right | 1.1 km || 
|-id=986 bgcolor=#fefefe
| 200986 ||  || — || February 7, 2002 || Socorro || LINEAR || NYS || align=right data-sort-value="0.99" | 990 m || 
|-id=987 bgcolor=#fefefe
| 200987 ||  || — || February 7, 2002 || Socorro || LINEAR || NYS || align=right | 1.1 km || 
|-id=988 bgcolor=#fefefe
| 200988 ||  || — || February 8, 2002 || Socorro || LINEAR || — || align=right | 1.6 km || 
|-id=989 bgcolor=#fefefe
| 200989 ||  || — || February 8, 2002 || Socorro || LINEAR || — || align=right | 1.9 km || 
|-id=990 bgcolor=#fefefe
| 200990 ||  || — || February 8, 2002 || Socorro || LINEAR || — || align=right | 1.0 km || 
|-id=991 bgcolor=#fefefe
| 200991 ||  || — || February 9, 2002 || Socorro || LINEAR || NYS || align=right data-sort-value="0.91" | 910 m || 
|-id=992 bgcolor=#fefefe
| 200992 ||  || — || February 9, 2002 || Socorro || LINEAR || NYS || align=right | 1.0 km || 
|-id=993 bgcolor=#fefefe
| 200993 ||  || — || February 9, 2002 || Socorro || LINEAR || — || align=right | 3.1 km || 
|-id=994 bgcolor=#fefefe
| 200994 ||  || — || February 10, 2002 || Socorro || LINEAR || MAS || align=right | 1.0 km || 
|-id=995 bgcolor=#fefefe
| 200995 ||  || — || February 6, 2002 || Socorro || LINEAR || ERI || align=right | 3.0 km || 
|-id=996 bgcolor=#fefefe
| 200996 ||  || — || February 6, 2002 || Socorro || LINEAR || NYS || align=right data-sort-value="0.87" | 870 m || 
|-id=997 bgcolor=#E9E9E9
| 200997 ||  || — || February 7, 2002 || Socorro || LINEAR || — || align=right | 1.2 km || 
|-id=998 bgcolor=#fefefe
| 200998 ||  || — || February 7, 2002 || Socorro || LINEAR || MAS || align=right data-sort-value="0.85" | 850 m || 
|-id=999 bgcolor=#fefefe
| 200999 ||  || — || February 8, 2002 || Socorro || LINEAR || — || align=right | 3.8 km || 
|-id=000 bgcolor=#fefefe
| 201000 ||  || — || February 8, 2002 || Socorro || LINEAR || — || align=right | 1.6 km || 
|}

References

External links 
 Discovery Circumstances: Numbered Minor Planets (200001)–(205000) (IAU Minor Planet Center)

0200